= List of tallest buildings in Houston =

Skyline of Houston
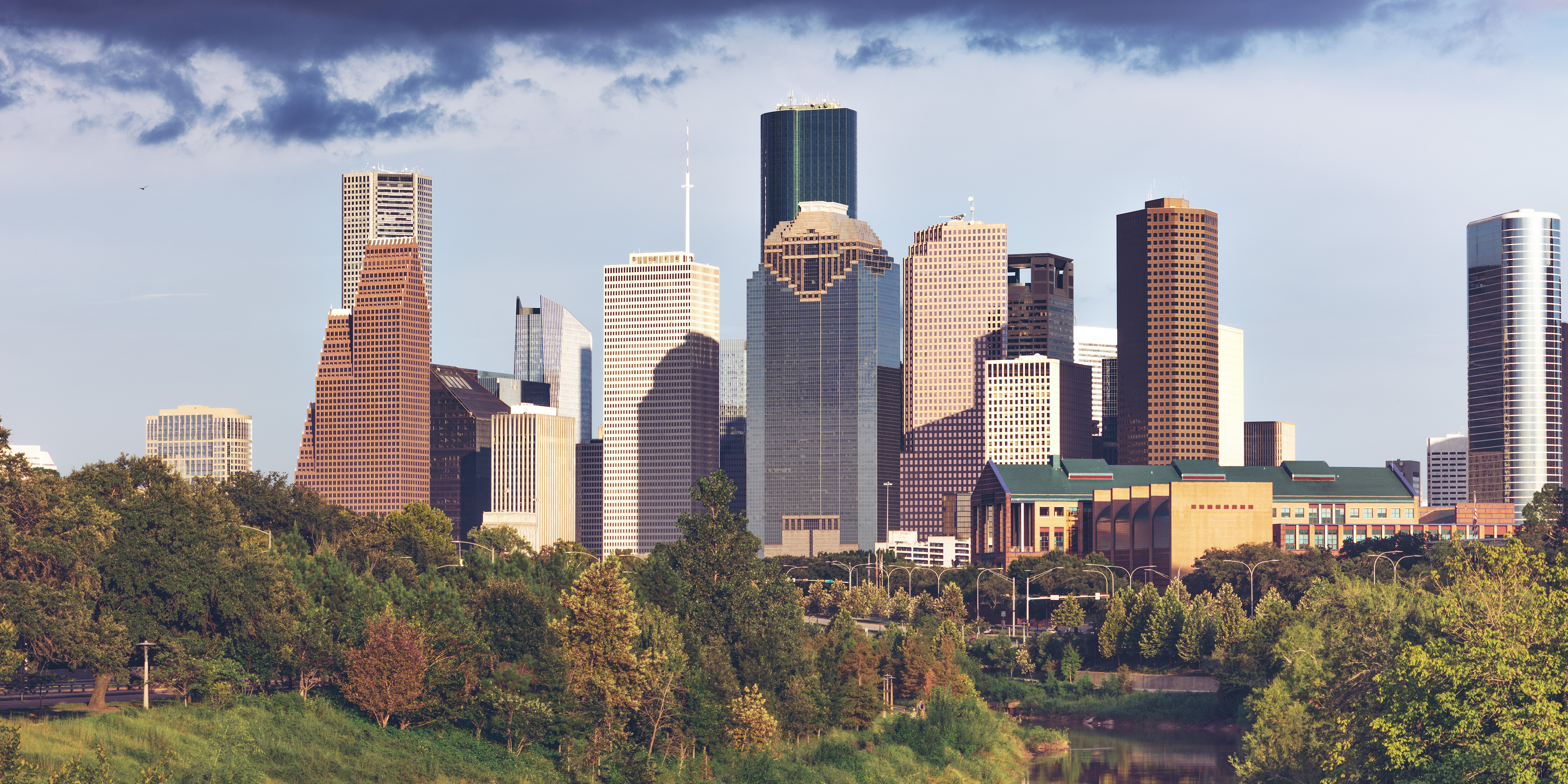
- An aerial view of Downtown Houston in 2018
- Tallest building: JPMorgan Chase Tower (1982)
- Tallest building height: 1,002 ft (305.4 m)
- Major clusters: Downtown Houston; Uptown Houston; Texas Medical Center
- First 150 m+ building: El Paso Energy Building (1962)

Number of tall buildings (2026)
- Taller than 100 m (328 ft): 115 + 2 T/O (Note: Topped-out)
- Taller than 150 m (492 ft): 40 + 1 T/O
- Taller than 200 m (656 ft): 16
- Taller than 300 m (984 ft): 2

Number of tall buildings — feet
- Taller than 300 ft (91.4 m): 151 + 2 T/O

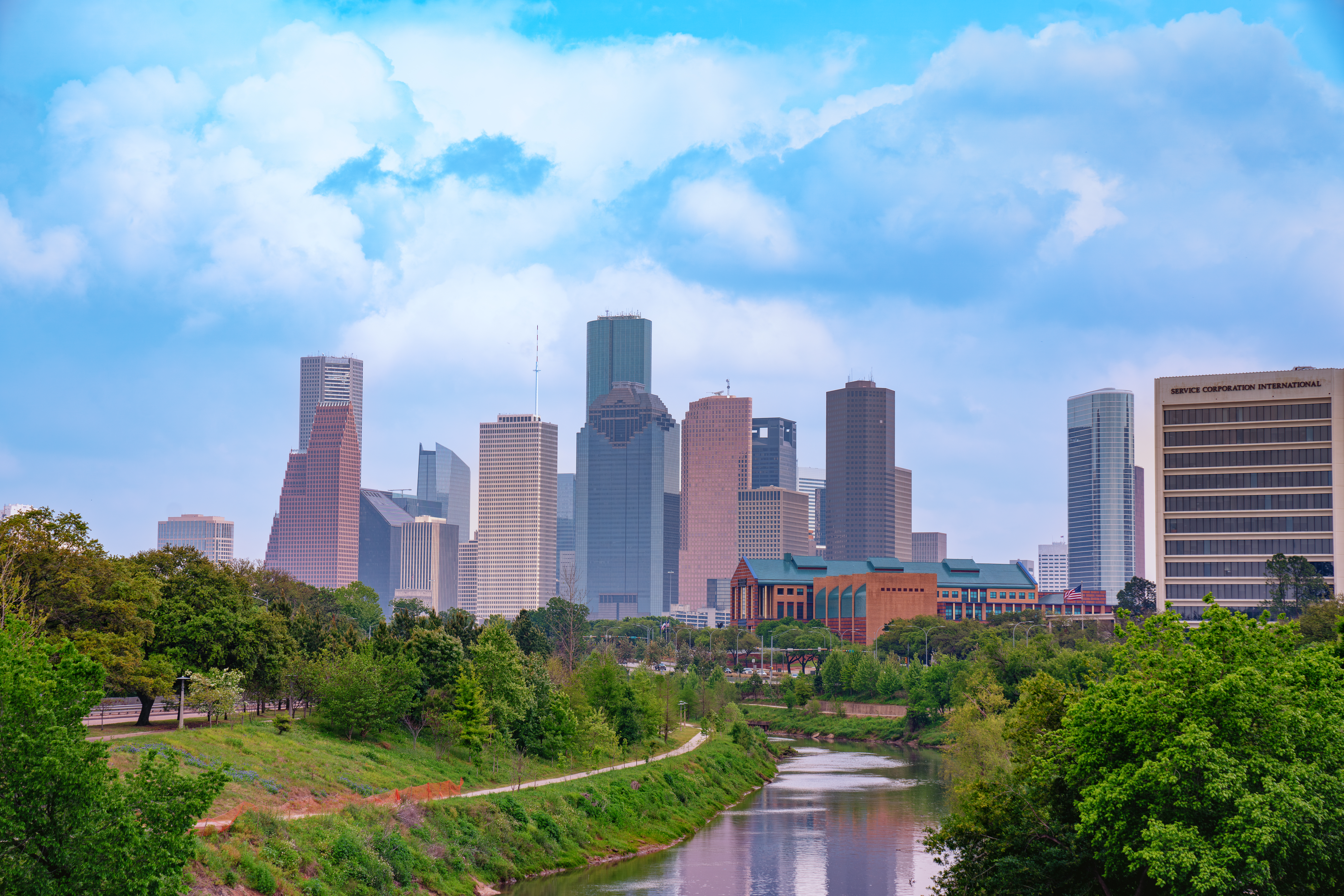
Downtown Houston and the Buffalo Bayou in 2019

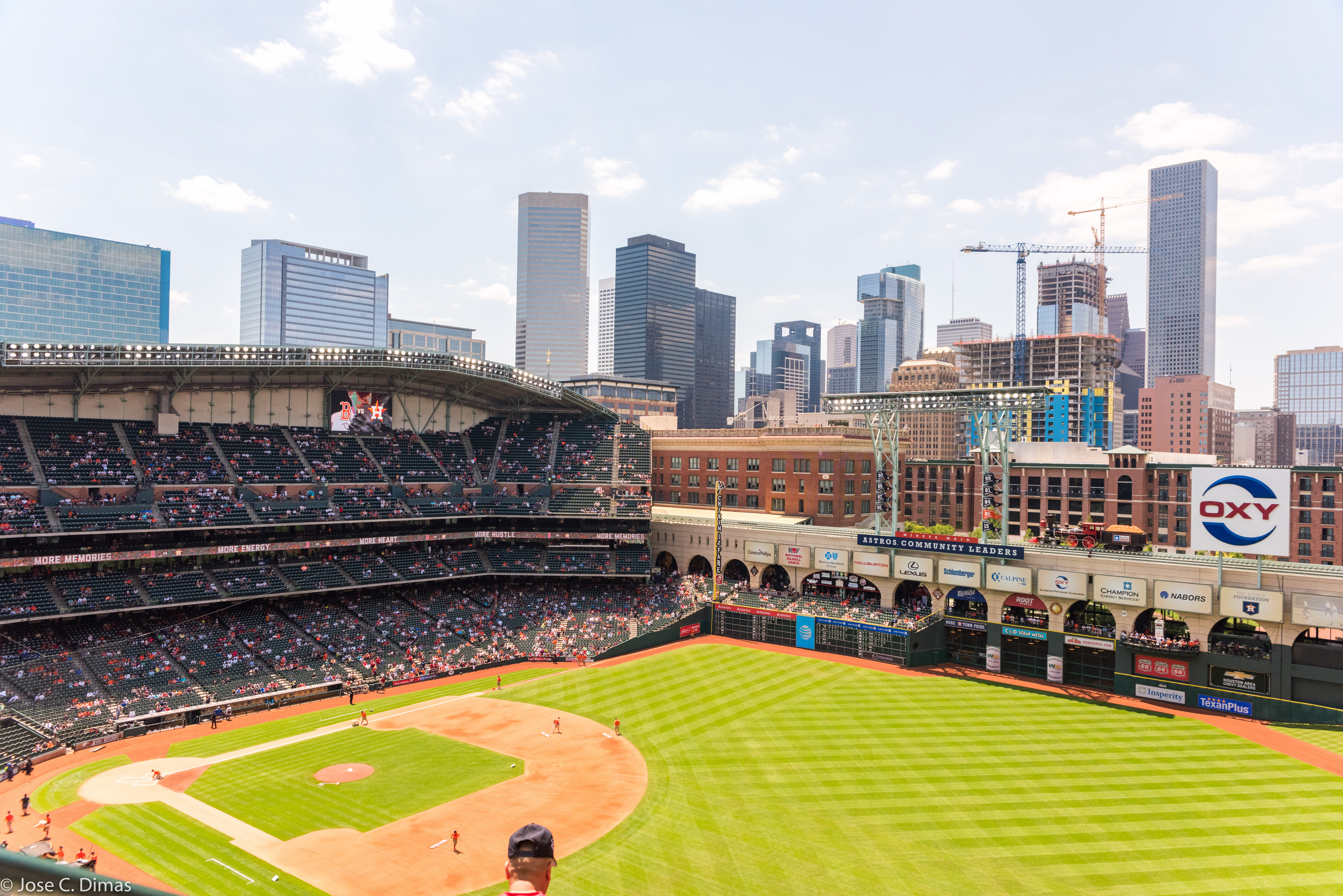
Houston's skyline from Daikin Park in 2016

Houston is the largest city in the U.S. state of Texas. Its metropolitan area of Greater Houston has a population of 7.8 million as of 2024. The city is home to 151 completed high-rise buildings that stand taller than 300 feet (91 m), 40 of which are taller than 492 ft (150 m) as of 2026. Houston's skyline is one of the largest in the United States, with the fourth-most skyscrapers taller than 492 ft (150 m) in the country after New York City, Chicago, and Miami; the skyline is the second-largest in the Southern United States, after Miami, and the largest in Texas. The tallest building in the city is the JPMorgan Chase Tower, which rises 1,002 ft (305 m) in Downtown Houston and was completed in 1982. It stood as the tallest building in Texas until the topping out of Waterline in Austin in 2025. It is one of the city's two supertall skyscrapers, the other being Wells Fargo Plaza, Houston's second-tallest building at 992 ft (302 m). Five of the ten tallest buildings in Texas are located in Houston.

The history of high-rises in Houston began with the original 6-story Binz Building in 1895, regarded as the first skyscraper in Houston. The city's skyline saw an early stage of growth in the 1920s. Owing to the Great Depression and World War II, little growth occurred from the 1930s to the mid-1950s. Houston's skyline grew steadily in the 1960s. New towers offered office space for oil and energy companies. The rate of development increased in the 1970s, and surged during the late 1970s and early 1980s as the price of oil increased during the 1970s energy crisis. Due to this, there are an abundance of postmodern skyscrapers in the city. During the 1980s to early 1990s, Houston had one of the largest skylines in the world. Following the 1980s oil glut and Texas real-estate crash, high-rise construction declined sharply. Houston's skyline resumed growth in the 2000s. Two major office skyscrapers taller than 700 ft (213 m) have been added since 2010: 609 Main at Texas in 2017, and Texas Tower in 2021.

While predominantly a low-rise city, Houston contains several high-rise neighborhoods. The tallest skyscrapers are concentrated in Downtown Houston, forming a central skyline bounded by Interstate 10 to the north, Interstate 45 to the northwest and southwest, and Interstate 69 to the southeast. Downtown Houston is dominated by office buildings; the 25-tallest buildings in Houston are all office skyscrapers. Approximately 6 miles west of downtown is the business district of Uptown Houston, which has the second-largest collection of high-rises in the city. By far the tallest building in Uptown is the Williams Tower, the third-tallest building in the city at 901 ft (275 m). Until the completion of the Brooklyn Tower in New York City in 2022, the Williams Tower was the tallest skyscraper in the United States outside of a city's central business district.

The Texas Medical Center (TMC), southwest of downtown, is Houston's third major high-rise cluster. The largest medical center in the world, the skyline of the TMC consists of several high-rise hospitals, as well as offices for medical institutions. Shorter and smaller clusters of tall buildings are found in Greenway Plaza/Upper Kirby, Memorial City, the Houston Energy Corridor, Greenspoint, and Westchase/Walnut Bend, as well as an emerging cluster in the city's Museum District. Due to Houston's lack of comprehensive zoning laws, there are a substantial number of individual high-rises located outside of these areas, including isolated towers such as The Huntingdon.

== History ==
Number of buildings by height in Houston by the end of each year, taking into account demolished buildings and buildings whose heights were increased following a renovation. Click on the legend to toggle a specific height on or off. View chart definition.

The history of skyscrapers in the city began with the construction of the original 6-story Binz Building in 1895, regarded as the first skyscraper in Houston. The city's skyline saw an early stage of growth in the 1920s, with early skyscrapers such as the Carter Building, the Niels Esperson Building, and the Gulf Building, which stood as the tallest building in Houston for over three decades until 1963. Owing to the Great Depression and World War II, little growth occurred from the 1930s to the mid-1950s. Houston's skyline grew steadily in the 1960s. New skyscrapers offered office space for oil and energy companies, an industry central to the city. The rate of skyscraper development increased in the 1970s, and especially surged during the late 1970s and early 1980s as the price of oil increased during the 1970s energy crisis. Many notable skyscrapers were completed during this period, including Houston's four tallest buildings. As a result, Houston's skyline is known for the prevalence of postmodern architecture, such as the TC Energy Center with its steeply pitched gabled roofline.

Following the 1980s oil glut and Texas real-estate crash, high-rise construction declined sharply. The city saw no new major office buildings until 2002, when 1500 Louisiana Street was completed. The building was meant to serve as Enron's new headquarters; however, the company collapsed before the building was finished. Houston's skyline returned to growth in the 2000s. Residential towers have become increasingly common, including isolated towers in low-rise neighborhoods between Downtown and Uptown Houston. In downtown, new high-rise buildings have mainly been built on the east side. Two major office skyscrapers taller than 700 ft (213 m) have been added since 2010: 609 Main at Texas in 2017, and Texas Tower in 2021. The skyline of the Texas Medical District changed significantly in the 2010s, including the construction of its tallest building, the Methodist Outpatient Care Center, in 2010.

== Cityscape ==
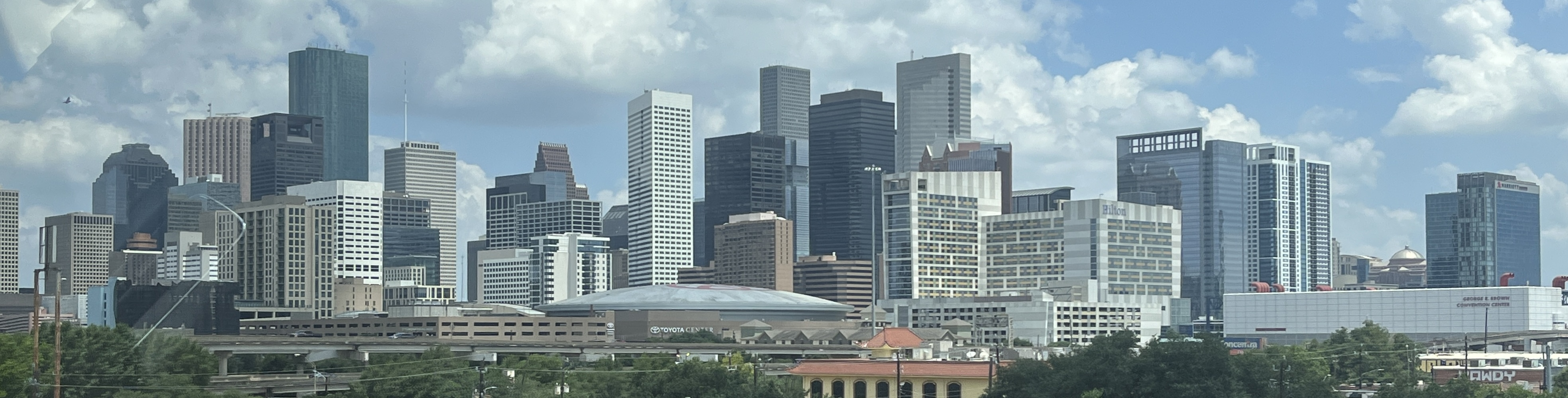
Downtown Houston in 2024

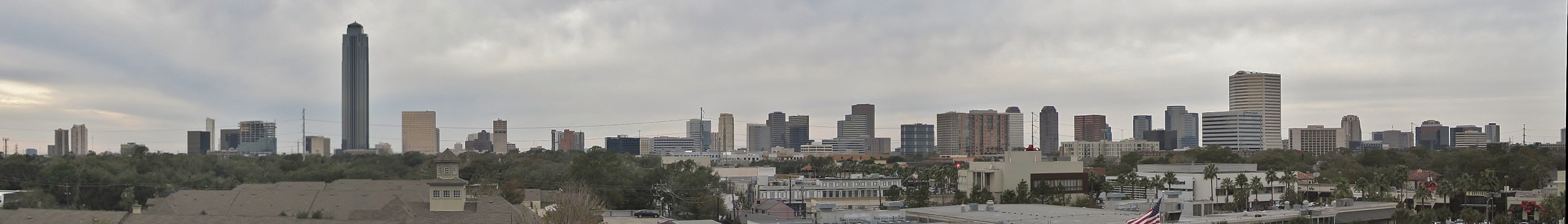
Panorama of Uptown Houston in 2012

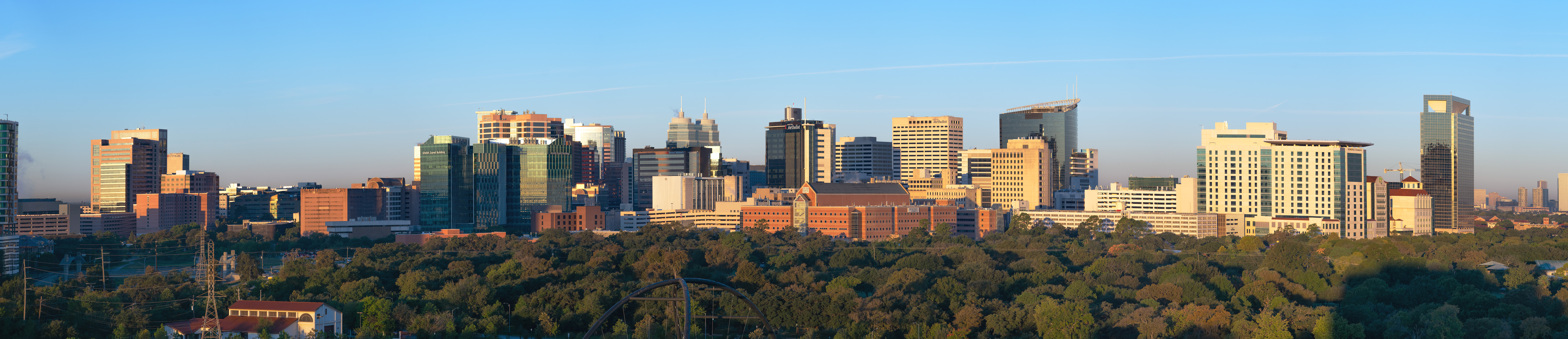
The Texas Medical Center, the world's largest medical center, in 2019

== Maps of tallest buildings ==
The map below shows the location of buildings taller than 300 feet (91 m) in Houston. Downtown Houston is in the northeast of the map, while Uptown Houston is in the northwest, and Texas Medical Center is in the south. Each marker is colored by the decade of the building's completion.

Not included are BP West Lake One and the Energy Center buildings in the Energy Corridor, Memorial Hermann Tower in Memorial City, Noble Energy Center Two in northwestern Houston, 4 Greenspoint Plaza in Greenspoint, and four high-rise buildings in Walnut Bend.

Buildings taller than 300 ft (91 m) in Houston.
- 1950s and before
- 1960s
- 1970s
- 1980s
- 1990s
- 2000s
- 2010s
- 2020s
18 San Felipe Plaza
21 America Tower
29 2929 Weslayan
37 The Huntingdon
52 Residences at La Colombe d’Or
54 Houston Buffalo Bayou
60 Residences at the Allen
70 2727 Kirby
72 The Mercer West Tower
76 The Parklane
89 Warwick Towers
90 The Royalton at River Oaks
92 Mosaic I
93 Montage
100 The Travis
104 The Kirby Collection Residential Tower
105 The Driscoll at River Oaks
107 Wortham Tower
109 The Mark
116 One Riverway
117 Capital One Plaza
118 Drewery Place
119 Hanover Montrose
144 Houstonian Condominiums
146 The Bristol

=== By neighborhood ===
Downtown Houston is the neighborhood with the most high-rises in Houston, containing around half of the buildings taller than 300 ft (91 m) in the city.

Downtown Houston

Buildings taller than 300 ft (91 m) in Downtown Houston.
- 1950s and before
- 1960s
- 1970s
- 1980s
- 1990s
- 2000s
- 2010s
- 2020s
1 Downtown
2 Wells Fargo Bank Plaza
4 TC Energy Center
5 Heritage Plaza
6 Enterprise Plaza
7 609 Main at Texas
8 CenterPoint Energy Plaza
9 Texas Tower
10 1600 Smith Street
11 Fulbright Tower
12 One Shell Plaza
13 1400 Smith Street
14 Three Allen Center
15 LyondellBassell Tower
16 First City Tower
17 811 Main
19 ExxonMobil Building
20 1500 Louisiana Street
22 Two Houston Center
23 Bank of America Tower
25 KBR Tower
26 Wedge International Tower
27 Brava
30 Pennzoil Place I
31 Pennzoil Place II
32 Devon Energy Center
33 1000 Main
34 Total Plaza
38 El Paso Energy Building
39 Market Square Tower
40 One Park Place
42 Hess Tower
43 Parkside Residences at Discovery Green
49 717 Texas Avenue
51 One Allen Center
53 Norton Rose Fulbright Tower
62 JPMorgan Chase Building (Houston)
67 Niels Esperson Building
68 One City Centre
69 Bob Lanier Public Works Building
71 Hyatt Regency Houston Downtown
73 1301 Fannin Street
78 Houston Police Deptartment Headquarters
81 Harris County Civil Justice Center
82 5 Houston Center
84 Marriott Marquis Houston
85 Aris Market Square
87 919 Milam
88 Lyric Center
100 Hilcorp Energy Tower
105 Le Meridian Hotel
109 Catalyst
111 Four Seasons Hotel
119 Magnolia Hotel
120 Holiday Inn
122 Harris County Criminal Justice Center
123 Hilton Americas Hotel
129 Travis Tower
130 Mickey Leland Federal Building
133 500 Jefferson Building
138 Elev8 Downtown Houston
145 Commerce Towers
148 JW Marriott Downtown Houston
153 Wells Fargo Center

Uptown Houston
Buildings taller than 300 ft (91 m).
- 1960s
- 1970s
- 1980s
- 1990s
- 2000s
- 2010s
- 2020s
3 Williams Tower
24 Marathon Oil Tower
41 The Post Oak
44 1500 Post Oak Boulevard
50 Aspire Post Oak
55 Four Leaf Towers 1
56 Four Leaf Towers 2
65 1330 Post Oak Boulevard
74 Arabella
77 Five Post Oak Park
83 Hanover Boulevard Place
91 Camden Post Oak
95 Amegy Tower
96 1360 Post Oak Tower
97 Wells Fargo Tower
98 Dominion at Post Oak
110 Galleria Tower I
112 Sage Plaza
113 Montebello
114 Hanover Post Oak
125 Astoria
127 Two Post Oak Central
128 Three Post Oak Central
131 One Post Oak Central
136 Cosmopolitan
141 3D International Tower
147 Control Data Center

Texas Medical Center
Buildings taller than 300 ft (91 m).
- 1970s
- 1980s
- 1990s
- 2000s
- 2010s
35 Methodist Outpatient Care Center
36 Houston Methodist Hospital - Centennial Tower
45 The O'Quinn Medical Tower at St. Luke's
48 Texas Children's Hospital Expansion
61 Memorial Hermann Medical Plaza
63 The Spires
64 Latitude Med Center
66 M.D. Anderson Administrative Support Building
75 Methodist Inpatient Hospital
80 Smith Tower at Methodist Hospital
86 MD Anderson Cancer Center
101 UT Health Center
124 T. Boone Pickens Academic Tower
126 St. Luke's Episcopal Hospital
135 Feigin Center West Tower
137 Feigin Center
139 Scurlock Tower

Greenway Plaza/Upper Kirby
Buildings taller than 300 ft (91 m).
- 1970s
- 1980s
46 5 Greenway Plaza
57 9 Greenway Plaza
58 11 Greenway Plaza
59 Phoenix Tower
150 3 Greenway Plaza
151 Greenway Condominiums Tower 1
152 Greenway Condominiums Tower 2

== Tallest buildings ==
This list ranks completed and topped out skyscrapers in Houston that stand at least 300 feet (91 m) tall as of 2026, based on standard height measurement. This height includes spires and architectural details but does not include antenna masts. Buildings tied in height are sorted by year of completion, and then alphabetically. (Note: If two or more buildings are of the same height, they are listed in order of floor count, then alphabetically. The "Year" column indicates the year in which a building was originally completed.)

Was the tallest building in Houston upon completion
Architecturally topped out but not yet completed

| Rank | Name | Image | Location | Height ft (m) | Floors | Year | Purpose | Notes |
|---|---|---|---|---|---|---|---|---|
| 1 | JPMorgan Chase Tower | | 29°45′37″N 95°21′50″W | 1,002 (305.4) | 75 | 1982 | Office | Second-tallest building in Texas. Formerly known as Texas Commerce Tower and 600 Travist Street. Renamed the JPMorgan Chase Tower in 2021. Tallest building completed in Houston in the 1980s. Tallest five-sided building in the world. At the time of completion, it was the eighth-tallest building in the world, and the tallest outside of New York City and Chicago. |
| 2 | Wells Fargo Bank Plaza | | 29°45′30″N 95°22′06″W | 992 (302.4) | 71 | 1983 | Office | Tallest all-glass building in the Western Hemisphere. Formerly known as the Allied Bank Plaza and First Interstate Bank Plaza. Also known by its street address, 1000 Louisiana. |
| 3 | Williams Tower | | 29°44′14″N 95°27′41″W | 901 (274.6) | 64 | 1982 | Office | Tallest building outside of downtown Houston. Formerly the tallest building in the United States outside of a city's central business district, until the completion of Brooklyn Tower in 2022. |
| 4 | TC Energy Center | | 29°45′38″N 95°22′00″W | 780 (237.8) | 56 | 1983 | Office | Known for its segmented setbacks, reminiscent of the Dutch Gothic architecture of canal houses in The Netherlands. Formerly known as the RepublicBank Center, the NCNB Center, the NationsBank Center, and the Bank of America Center. Named the TC Energy Center in 2019. |
| 5 | Heritage Plaza | | 29°45′32″N 95°22′15″W | 762 (232.3) | 53 | 1987 | Office | One of the last major office buildings completed in the 1980s after the collapse of the Texas real estate, banking, and oil industries in the early 1980s. |
| 6 | Enterprise Plaza | | 29°45′28″N 95°22′08″W | 756 (230.4) | 55 | 1980 | Office | Tallest building in Houston from 1980 to 1982. |
| 7 | 609 Main at Texas | | 29°45′33″N 95°21′45″W | 755 (230.1) | 48 | 2017 | Office | Tallest building completed in Houston in the 2010s. |
| 8 | CenterPoint Energy Plaza | | 29°45′26″N 95°22′05″W | 741 (225.9) | 53 | 1973 | Office | Originally completed at a height of 651 feet (198 m), the building's height was extended in 1996. |
| 9 | Texas Tower | | 29°45′40″N 95°21′49″W | 735 (224) | 48 | 2021 | Office | Tallest building completed in Houston in the 2020s. |
| 10 | 1600 Smith Street | | 29°45′16″N 95°22′22″W | 732 (223.1) | 55 | 1984 | Office | |
| 11 | Fulbright Tower | | 29°45′20″N 95°21′42″W | 725 (221) | 52 | 1982 | Office | |
| 12 | One Shell Plaza | | 29°45′33″N 95°22′04″W | 714 (217.6) | 50 | 1970 | Office | Tallest building completed in Houston in the 1970s. Tallest building in Houston from 1970 to 1980. |
| 13 | 1400 Smith Street | | 29°45′20″N 95°22′18″W | 691 (210.6) | 50 | 1983 | Office | |
| 14 | Three Allen Center | | 29°45′26″N 95°22′19″W | 685 (208.8) | 50 | 1980 | Office | |
| 15 | LyondellBassell Tower | | 29°45′22″N 95°21′45″W | 678 (206.7) | 47 | 1978 | Office | |
| 16 | First City Tower | | 29°45′21″N 95°21′50″W | 662 (201.8) | 47 | 1984 | Office | |
| 17 | 811 Main | | 29°45′29″N 95°21′49″W | 632 (192.7) | 46 | 2011 | Office | Formerly known as BG Group Place and MainPlace. |
| 18 | San Felipe Plaza | | 29°44′58″N 95°28′55″W | 625 (190.5) | 45 | 1984 | Office | |
| 19 | ExxonMobil Building | | 29°45′13″N 95°22′10″W | 606 (184.7) | 44 | 1963 | Office | Tallest building completed in Houston in the 1960s. Tallest building in Houston from 1963 to 1970. Formerly known as the Humble Oil Building until 1973. |
| 20 | 1500 Louisiana Street | | 29°45′17″N 95°22′16″W | 600 (182.9) | 40 | 2002 | Office | Tallest building completed in Houston in the 2000s. |
| 21 | America Tower | | 29°45′39″N 95°23′51″W | 590 (179.8) | 42 | 1983 | Office | |
| 22 | Two Houston Center | | 29°45′23″N 95°21′48″W | 579 (176.5) | 40 | 1974 | Office | |
| 23 | Bank of America Tower | – | 29°45′35″N 95°21′53″W | 579 (176.5) | 34 | 2019 | Office | Also known as Capitol Tower. |
| 24 | Marathon Oil Tower | | 29°44′59″N 95°28′19″W | 562 (171.3) | 41 | 1983 | Office | Also known as 5555 San Felipe Street |
| 25 | KBR Tower | | 29°45′12″N 95°22′20″W | 550 (167.6) | 40 | 1973 | Office | |
| 26 | Wedge International Tower | – | 29°45′17″N 95°22′12″W | 550 (167.6) | 44 | 1983 | Office | Formerly known as the Southwest Bank of Texas Building, Unitedbank Plaza, and 1415 Louisiana. |
| 27 | Brava | – | 29°45′45″N 95°21′49″W | 549 (167.3) | 46 | 2022 | Residential | Tallest residential building in Houston since 2022. |
| 28 | Memorial Hermann Tower | | 29°46′57″N 95°32′44″W | 542 (165.2) | 35 | 2009 | Mixed-use | Part of the Memorial Hermann Memorial City Medical Center. |
| 29 | 2929 Weslayan | | 29°44′19″N 95°26′28″W | 533 (162.5) | 40 | 2015 | Residential | Tallest residential building in Houston from 2015 to 2022. |
| 30 | Pennzoil Place I | | 29°45′37″N 95°21′56″W | 523 (159.4) | 36 | 1976 | Office | |
| 31 | Pennzoil Place II | | 29°45′36″N 95°21′57″W | 523 (159.4) | 36 | 1976 | Office | |
| 32 | Devon Energy Center | | 29°45′25″N 95°22′16″W | 521 (158.8) | 36 | 1978 | Office | |
| 33 | 1000 Main | | 29°45′25″N 95°21′56″W | 518 (158) | 36 | 2003 | Office | |
| 34 | Total Plaza | | 29°45′24″N 95°22′06″W | 518 (157.9) | 35 | 1971 | Office | |
| 35 | Methodist Outpatient Care Center | | 29°42′45″N 95°23′58″W | 512 (156.1) | 26 | 2010 | Health | Tallest building in the Texas Medical Center. |
| 36 | Houston Methodist Hospital - Centennial Tower | – | 29°42′40″N 95°23′52″W | 511 (155.8) | 26 | 2027 (Note: Estimated completion date as of 2026.) | Health | Construction started in 2022. Topped out in September 2025. |
| 37 | The Huntingdon | | 29°44′49″N 95°25′05″W | 503 (153.3) | 34 | 1982 | Residential | Tallest residential building in Houston until 2015. |
| 38 | El Paso Energy Building | | 29°45′28″N 95°22′03″W | 502 (153) | 33 | 1962 | Office | |
| 39 | Market Square Tower | | 29°45′47″N 95°21′48″W | 502 (153) | 40 | 2017 | Residential | |
| 40 | One Park Place | | 29°45′15″N 95°21′40″W | 501 (152.7) | 37 | 2009 | Residential | |
| 41 | The Post Oak | | 29°45′08″N 95°27′26″W | 499 (152.1) | 36 | 2018 | Mixed-use | Mixed-use residential, hotel, and office building. |
| 42 | Hess Tower | | 29°45′17″N 95°21′35″W | 490 (149.4) | 29 | 2010 | Office | |
| 43 | Parkside Residences at Discovery Green | – | 29°45′18″N 95°21′33″W | 480 (146.3) | 43 | 2022 | Residential | |
| 44 | 1500 Post Oak Boulevard | – | 29°45′08″N 95°27′39″W | 477 (145.4) | 30 | 2016 | Office | |
| 45 | The O'Quinn Medical Tower at St. Luke's | | 29°42′33″N 95°24′07″W | 477 (145.3) | 29 | 1990 | Mixed-use | Tallest building completed in Houston in the 1990s. Also known as 6624 Fannin Tower. Part of Baylor St. Luke's Medical Center, an adult teaching hospital. |
| 46 | 5 Greenway Plaza | – | 29°43′50″N 95°25′54″W | 465 (141.7) | 31 | 1973 | Office | |
| 47 | Hanover River Oaks | – | 29°44′23″N 95°25′11″W | 462 (140.8) | 38 | 2020 | Residential | |
| 48 | Texas Children's Hospital Expansion | – | 29°42′29″N 95°24′11″W | 457 (139.3) | 25 | 2018 | Health | Also known as the Texas Children's Hospital Lester and Sue Smith Legacy Tower. |
| 49 | 717 Texas Avenue | | 29°45′42″N 95°21′51″W | 453 (138.2) | 34 | 2003 | Office | |
| 50 | Aspire Post Oak | – | 29°45′04″N 95°27′42″W | 453 (138.1) | 39 | 2021 | Residential | |
| 51 | One Allen Center | | 29°45′28″N 95°22′14″W | 452 (137.8) | 34 | 1972 | Office | |
| 52 | Residences at La Colombe d’Or | – | 29°44′30″N 95°23′32″W | 452 (137.8) | 34 | 2020 | Residential | |
| 53 | Norton Rose Fulbright Tower | – | 29°45′11″N 95°21′39″W | 450 (137.2) | 28 | 2024 | Office | Also known as 1550 on the Green. |
| 54 | Hanover Buffalo Bayou | – | 29°45′34″N 95°24′23″W | 449 (136.9) | 42 | 2025 | Residential | Topped-out in September 2025. |
| 55 | Four Leaf Towers 1 | | 29°45′06″N 95°27′50″W | 444 (135.3) | 40 | 1982 | Residential | |
| 56 | Four Leaf Towers 2 | | 29°45′03″N 95°27′52″W | 444 (135.3) | 40 | 1982 | Residential | |
| 57 | 9 Greenway Plaza | – | 29°43′56″N 95°26′04″W | 441 (134.4) | 31 | 1978 | Office | |
| 58 | 11 Greenway Plaza | – | 29°43′56″N 95°26′08″W | 441 (134.4) | 31 | 1979 | Office | |
| 59 | Phoenix Tower | – | 29°43′50″N 95°25′44″W | 434 (132.3) | 34 | 1984 | Office | |
| 60 | Residences at the Allen | – | 29°45′39″N 95°22′56″W | 430 (131) (Note: This height is an estimate from the CTBUH.) | 35 | 2023 | Residential | Construction started in 2020. |
| 61 | Memorial Hermann Medical Plaza | – | 29°42′55″N 95°23′50″W | 430 (131) | 28 | 2007 | Mixed-use | Office and hospital building. |
| 62 | 712 Main Street | | 29°45′32″N 95°21′50″W | 428 (130.5) | 37 | 1929 | Office | Tallest building completed in Houston in the 1920s and in the first half of the 20th century. Tallest building in Houston from 1929 to 1963. |
| 63 | The Spires | | 29°42′25″N 95°23′19″W | 426 (129.9) | 40 | 1983 | Residential | |
| 64 | Latitude Med Center | – | 29°42′29″N 95°24′18″W | 423 (128.9) | 35 | 2018 | Residential | |
| 65 | 1330 Post Oak Boulevard | – | 29°45′12″N 95°27′41″W | 420 (128) | 30 | 1983 | Office | |
| 66 | M.D. Anderson Administrative Support Building | – | 29°42′01″N 95°23′56″W | 415 (126.5) | 25 | 2012 | Office | |
| 67 | Niels Esperson Building | | 29°45′32″N 95°21′54″W | 410 (125.1) | 31 | 1927 | Office | Tallest building in Houston from 1927 to 1929. |
| 68 | One City Centre | – | 29°45′22″N 95°21′53″W | 410 (125) | 32 | 1961 | Office | |
| 69 | Bob Lanier Public Works Building | | 29°45′35″N 95°22′02″W | 410 (125) | 27 | 1968 | Office | |
| 70 | 2727 Kirby | | 29°44′28″N 95°25′06″W | 405 (123.5) | 30 | 2009 | Residential | |
| 71 | Hyatt Regency Houston Downtown | | 29°45′25″N 95°22′10″W | 401 (122.2) | 30 | 1972 | Hotel | |
| 72 | The Mercer West Tower | | 29°43′57″N 95°28′04″W | 401 (122.1) | 30 | 2003 | Residential | |
| 73 | 1301 Fannin Street | – | 29°45′13″N 95°21′56″W | 399 (121.6) | 25 | 1984 | Office | |
| 74 | Arabella | – | 29°44′46″N 95°27′17″W | 399 (121.6) | 33 | 2018 | Residential | |
| 75 | Methodist Inpatient Hospital | – | 29°42′37″N 95°23′53″W | 395 (120.4) | 17 | 2018 | Health | |
| 76 | The Parklane | – | 29°43′08″N 95°23′01″W | 390 (119) | 36 | 1983 | Residential | |
| 77 | Five Post Oak Park | – | 29°44′52″N 95°27′06″W | 389 (118.6) | 28 | 1982 | Office | |
| 78 | Houston Police Department Headquarters | – | 29°45′21″N 95°22′03″W | 386 (117.7) | 28 | 1967 | Government | |
| 79 | BP West Lake One | – | 29°46′52″N 95°37′46″W | 382 (116.4) | 28 | 1982 | Office | |
| 80 | Smith Tower at Methodist Hospital | | 29°42′41″N 95°24′00″W | 378 (115.2) | 26 | 1988 | Mixed-use | Mixed-use education and hospital building. |
| 81 | Harris County Civil Justice Center | | 29°45′39″N 95°21′27″W | 378 (115.2) | 18 | 2005 | Government | |
| 82 | 5 Houston Center | – | 29°45′17″N 95°21′39″W | 376 (114.5) | 27 | 2003 | Office | |
| 83 | Hanover Boulevard Place | – | 29°44′53″N 95°27′49″W | 375 (114.3) | 30 | 2019 | Residential | Also stylized as Hanover BLVD Place. |
| 84 | Marriott Marquis Houston | – | 29°45′16″N 95°21′28″W | 371 (113.1) | 28 | 2016 | Hotel | |
| 85 | Aris Market Square | – | 29°45′42″N 95°21′44″W | 371 (113.1) | 32 | 2017 | Residential | |
| 86 | MD Anderson Cancer Center | | 29°42′28″N 95°23′54″W | 370 (112.8) | 22 | 2009 | Health | |
| 87 | 919 Milam | – | 29°45′30″N 95°21′58″W | 369 (112.5) | 24 | 1956 | Office | |
| 88 | Lyric Center | – | 29°45′46″N 95°21′53″W | 365 (111.3) | 26 | 1984 | Office | |
| 89 | Warwick Towers | – | 29°43′25″N 95°23′22″W | 360 (110) | 30 | 1984 | Residential | |
| 90 | The Royalton at River Oaks | – | 29°45′37″N 95°24′02″W | 360 (109.7) | 33 | 2003 | Residential | |
| 91 | Camden Post Oak | – | 29°45′13″N 95°27′34″W | 359 (109.4) | 33 | 2003 | Residential | Also known as 1200 Post Oak. |
| 92 | Mosaic I | | 29°42′55″N 95°22′50″W | 358 (109.1) | 29 | 2007 | Residential | |
| 93 | Montage | – | 29°42′52″N 95°22′51″W | 358 (109.1) | 29 | 2009 | Residential | |
| 94 | Energy Center IV | – | 29°46′58″N 95°37′08″W | 355 (108.2) | 22 | 2015 | Office | |
| 95 | Amegy Tower | – | 29°44′57″N 95°27′18″W | 354 (108) | 24 | 2016 | Office | |
| 96 | 1360 Post Oak Tower | – | 29°45′11″N 95°27′44″W | 351 (107) | 25 | 1985 | Office | |
| 97 | Wells Fargo Tower | – | 29°45′11″N 95°27′37″W | 351 (107) | 25 | 1983 | Office | |
| 98 | Dominion at Post Oak | – | 29°44′39″N 95°27′50″W | 351 (107) | 31 | 2004 | Residential | |
| 99 | The Travis | – | 29°44′28″N 95°22′42″W | 351 (107) | 28 | 2020 | Residential | Also known as 3300 Main. |
| 100 | Hilcorp Energy Tower | – | 29°45′22″N 95°21′59″W | 346 (105.5) | 23 | 2016 | Office | |
| 101 | UT Health Center | | 29°42′12″N 95°24′12″W | 345 (105.2) | 25 | 1974 | Mixed-use | Mixed-use educational and hospital building. |
| 102 | Two Shell Plaza | – | 29°45′33″N 95°21′59″W | 341 (103.9) | 26 | 1971 | Office | |
| 103 | The Kirby Collection Residential Tower | – | 29°44′10″N 95°25′11″W | 340 (103.6) | 22 | 2017 | Residential | |
| 104 | The Driscoll at River Oaks | – | 29°45′13″N 95°24′24″W | 339 (103.3) | 27 | 2020 | Residential | |
| 105 | Le Meridian Hotel | – | 29°45′25″N 95°21′46″W | 338 (103) | 25 | 1954 | Hotel | This building was originally built as the Melrose Building, at a height of 308 ft (94 m). It was renovated as Le Meridian Hotel in 2017, and its height was increased. |
| 106 | Wortham Tower | – | 29°45′37″N 95°23′41″W | 337 (102.7) | 25 | 1965 | Office | |
| 107 | ParkWest Tower I | – | 29°44′18″N 95°33′41″W | 337 (102.7) | 25 | 1984 | Office | |
| 108 | The Mark | – | 29°43′47″N 95°27′58″W | 334 (101.8) | 30 | 2001 | Residential | |
| 109 | Catalyst | – | 29°45′29″N 95°21′31″W | 334 (101.8) | 28 | 2017 | Residential | |
| 110 | Galleria Tower I | | 29°44′18″N 95°27′41″W | 333 (101.5) | 25 | 1973 | Office | |
| 111 | Four Seasons Hotel | – | 29°45′15″N 95°21′45″W | 330 (100.6) | 29 | 1981 | Hotel | |
| 112 | Sage Plaza | – | 29°44′59″N 95°27′54″W | 330 (100.6) | 25 | 1983 | Office | |
| 113 | Montebello | – | 29°45′23″N 95°27′30″W | 330 (100.6) | 30 | 2004 | Residential | |
| 114 | Hanover Post Oak | – | 29°44′56″N 95°27′50″W | 330 (100.6) | 29 | 2014 | Residential | |
| 115 | One Riverway | – | 29°45′40″N 95°27′46″W | 330 (100) | 25 | 1978 | Office | |
| 116 | Capital One Plaza | – | 29°44′18″N 95°28′44″W | 330 (100) | 22 | 1982 | Office | |
| 117 | Drewery Place | – | 29°44′37″N 95°22′30″W | 330 (100) | 27 | 2019 | Residential | |
| 118 | Hanover Montrose | – | 29°44′32″N 95°23′31″W | 326 (99.4) | 30 | 2016 | Residential | |
| 119 | Magnolia Hotel | | 29°45′33″N 95°21′42″W | 325 (99.1) | 22 | 1926 | Hotel | Tallest building in Houston from 1926 to 1927. |
| 120 | Holiday Inn | – | 29°45′05″N 95°22′17″W | 325 (99.1) | 30 | 1971 | Hotel | |
| 121 | 4 Greenspoint Plaza | – | 29°56′51″N 95°24′25″W | 325 (99.1) | 24 | 1983 | Office | |
| 122 | Harris County Criminal Justice Center | | 29°45′43″N 95°21′28″W | 325 (99.1) | 21 | 1999 | Government | |
| 123 | Hilton Americas Hotel | – | 29°45′06″N 95°21′38″W | 324 (98.8) | 24 | 2003 | Hotel | |
| 124 | T. Boone Pickens Academic Tower | – | 29°42′17″N 95°23′49″W | 324 (98.8) | 21 | 2008 | Mixed-use | Mixed-use education and office building. |
| 125 | Astoria | – | 29°45′09″N 95°27′34″W | 322 (98.1) | 25 | 2016 | Residential | |
| 126 | St. Luke's Episcopal Hospital | | 29°42′29″N 95°24′01″W | 322 (98) | 26 | 1970 | Health | |
| 127 | Two Post Oak Central | – | 29°44′43″N 95°27′46″W | 321 (97.8) | 24 | 1979 | Office | |
| 128 | Three Post Oak Central | – | 29°44′46″N 95°27′43″W | 321 (97.8) | 24 | 1981 | Office | |
| 129 | Travis Tower | – | 29°45′17″N 95°22′03″W | 320 (97.5) | 21 | 1955 | Residential | |
| 130 | Mickey Leland Federal Building | | 29°45′07″N 95°22′25″W | 320 (97.5) | 22 | 1983 | Mixed-use | Mixed-use office and government building. |
| 131 | One Post Oak Central | – | 29°44′41″N 95°27′42″W | 318 (96.9) | 25 | 1975 | Office | |
| 132 | Energy Center III | – | 29°47′02″N 95°37′08″W | 317 (96.5) | 20 | 2015 | Office | |
| 133 | 500 Jefferson Building | | 29°45′11″N 95°22′26″W | 316 (96.3) | 21 | 1963 | Office | |
| 134 | City West Place 2 | – | 29°44′40″N 95°33′38″W | 316 (96.3) | 23 | 2001 | Office | |
| 135 | Feigin Center West Tower | – | 29°42′28″N 95°24′06″W | 315 (96) | 19 | 2001 | Health | Part of Texas Children's Hospital |
| 136 | Cosmopolitan | – | 29°45′06″N 95°27′41″W | 315 (96) | 24 | 2008 | Residential | |
| 137 | Feigin Center | – | 29°42′24″N 95°24′04″W | 315 (96) | 20 | 2008 | Mixed-use | Mixed-use hospital and office building. |
| 138 | Elev8 Downtown Houston | – | 29°45′09″N 95°22′22″W | 312 (95.1) | 20 | 1971 | Residential | |
| 139 | Scurlock Tower | – | 29°42′39″N 95°24′02″W | 311 (94.8) | 20 | 1981 | Office | |
| 140 | Briarlake Plaza | – | 29°44′46″N 95°33′35″W | 311 (94.8) | 20 | 2000 | Office | |
| 141 | 3D International Tower | – | 29°44′51″N 95°27′28″W | 310 (94.5) | 22 | 1980 | Office | |
| 142 | Houstonian Condominiums | – | 29°46′05″N 95°27′32″W | 310 (94.5) | 28 | 1982 | Residential | |
| 143 | Noble Energy Center Two | – | 29°59′44″N 95°34′47″W | 310 (94.5) | 20 | 2015 | Office | |
| 144 | The Bristol | – | 29°43′47″N 95°27′55″W | 309 (94.2) | 27 | 1983 | Residential | |
| 145 | Commerce Towers | – | 29°45′28″N 95°21′53″W | 306 (93.3) | 24 | 1929 | Office | |
| 146 | City West Place 1 | – | 29°44′33″N 95°33′34″W | 306 (93.3) | 22 | 2001 | Office | |
| 147 | Control Data Center | – | 29°44′47″N 95°27′28″W | 303 (92.4) | 22 | 1971 | Office | |
| 148 | JW Marriott Downtown Houston | | 29°45′30″N 95°21′51″W | 302 (92.1) | 22 | 1925 | Hotel | Tallest building in Houston from 1925 to 1926. |
| 149 | Energy Center V | – | 29°46′53″N 95°37′06″W | 302 (92) | 18 | 2015 | Office | |
| 150 | 3 Greenway Plaza | – | 29°43′53″N 95°25′53″W | 300 (91.4) | 22 | 1971 | Office | |
| 151 | Greenway Condominiums Tower 1 | – | 29°43′52″N 95°26′13″W | 300 (91.4) | 30 | 1980 | Residential | |
| 152 | Greenway Condominiums Tower 2 | – | 29°43′54″N 95°26′13″W | 300 (91.4) | 30 | 1981 | Residential | |
| 153 | Wells Fargo Center | – | 29°45′31″N 95°21′52″W | 300 (91.4) | 21 | 1981 | Office | |

== Tallest buildings in Greater Houston ==
Greater Houston
- Population: 7,796,182 (2024 estimate)
- Cities included: Houston, Galveston, Pasadena, The Woodlands

Number of tall buildings
- Taller than 100 m (328 ft): 121 + 2 T/O (2025)
- Taller than 150 m (492 ft): 40 + 1 T/O (2025)
- Taller than 200 m (656 ft): 16
- Taller than 300 m (984 ft): 2

Number of tall buildings — feet
- Taller than 300 ft (91.4 m): 157 + 2 T/O (2025)

There are several high-rises taller than 300 feet (91 m) in Greater Houston that are located outside of the city of Houston: three in Galveston, two in The Woodlands, and one in Pasadena.

| Rank | Name | Image | City | Height ft (m) | Floors | Year | Purpose | Notes |
|---|---|---|---|---|---|---|---|---|
| 1 | Allison Tower | | The Woodlands 30°09′38″N 95°27′10″W | 439 (133.8) | 32 | 2002 | Office | Tallest building in The Woodlands. Tallest building in Greater Houston located outside Houston. Also known as 1201 Lake Robbins Drive or Anadarko Tower I. |
| 2 | Hackett Tower | | The Woodlands 30°09′37″N 95°27′18″W | 415 (126.5) | 31 | 2014 | Office | Second-tallest building in The Woodlands. |
| 3 | Endeavour | | Pasadena 29°33′55″N 95°03′45″W | 386 (117.7) | 30 | 2007 | Mixed-use | Mixed-use residential and hotel building. Tallest building in Pasadena. |
| 4 | Palisade Palms I | – | Galveston 29°18′57″N 94°45′17″W | 382 (116.4) | 27 | 2007 | Residential | Also known as The Trade Winds and Beach Club Residences I. Joint-tallest building in Galveston. |
| 5 | Palisade Palms II | – | Galveston 29°18′58″N 94°45′15″W | 382 (116.4) | 27 | 2007 | Residential | Also known as The Beach Club and Beach Club Residences II. Joint-tallest building in Galveston |
| 6 | One Moody Plaza | | Galveston 29°18′25″N 94°47′24″W | 358 (109.1) | 23 | 1972 | Office | Tallest building in Galveston from 1972 to 2007. Tallest office building in Galveston. |

== Tallest under construction or proposed ==
=== Under construction ===
The following table includes buildings under construction in Houston that are planned to be at least 300 ft (91 m) tall as of 2026, based on standard height measurement. The “Year” column indicates the expected year of completion. Buildings that are on hold are not included, while those that are topped out are included in the above list.

| Name | Height ft (m) | Floors | Year | Notes |
|---|---|---|---|---|
| St. Regis Residences | 510 (155.4) | 38 | 2029 | |
| Forme | 449 (136.9) | 33 | 2026 | Formerly known as X Houston. |
| The Lily River Oaks/2811 Kirby | – | 37 | 2027 | |
| The Birdsall Hotel & Condos | – | 34 | 2027 | |

== Tallest demolished ==
This table lists buildings in Houston that were demolished and at one time stood at least 300 feet (91 m) in height.

| Rank | Name | Image | Height ft (m) | Floors | Year completed | Year demolished | Notes |
|---|---|---|---|---|---|---|---|
| 1 | Sheraton-Lincoln Hotel | – | 352 (107.3) | 28 | 1962 | 2011 | |
| 2 | Texas Tower | – | 312 (95.1) | 21 | 1952 | 2014 | |
| 3 | Houston Main Building | – | 312 (95.1) | 21 | 1931 | 2012 | Formerly the Prudential Building. |

== Timeline of tallest buildings ==
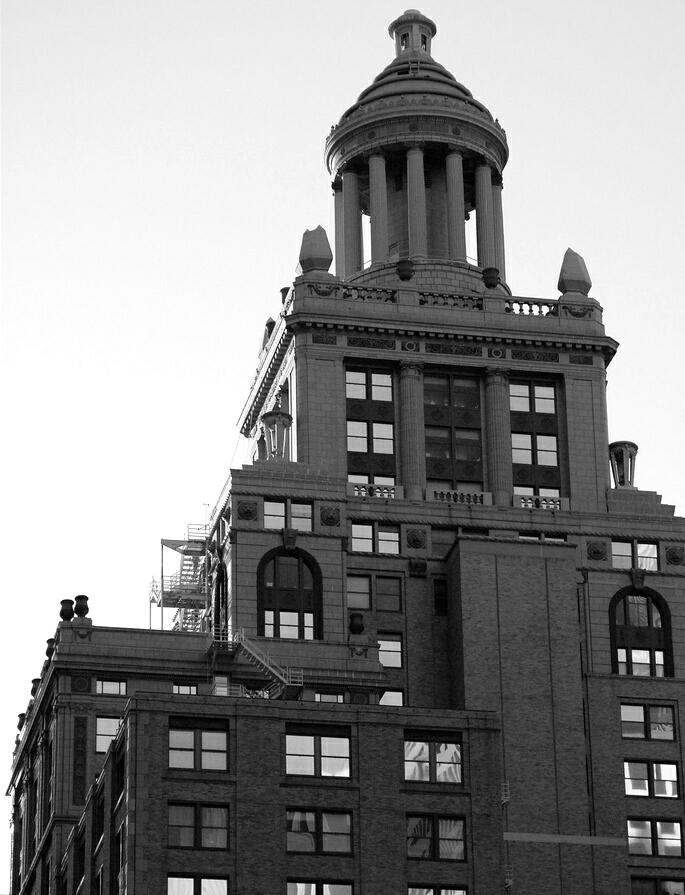
The Niels Esperson Building stood as the tallest building in Houston from 1927 until 1929.

Since 1895, the year the first high-rise in the city was constructed, the title of the tallest building in Houston has been held by eleven high-rises.

| Original name | Image | Years as tallest | Height ft (m) | Floors | Notes |
|---|---|---|---|---|---|
| Binz Building (Note: Height unknown. Demolished in 1950.) | – | 1895–1904 (9 years) | — | 6 | |
| Lomas & Nettleton Building | | 1904–1908 (4 years) | 105 (32) | 8 | |
| 711 Main | | 1908–1910 (2 years) | 124 (40.8) | 10 | |
| Carter Building | | 1910–1926 (16 years) | 302 (92.1) | 23 | |
| Magnolia Hotel | | 1926–1927 (1 year) | 325 (99.1) | 22 | |
| Niels Esperson Building | | 1927–1929 (2 years) | 410 (125.1) | 31 | |
| Gulf Building | | 1929–1963 (34 years) | 428 (130.5) | 37 | Now known as the JPMorgan Chase Building. |
| Humble Building | | 1963–1970 (7 years) | 606 (184.7) | 44 | Now known as the ExxonMobil Building. |
| One Shell Plaza | | 1970–1980 (10 years) | 714 (217.6) | 50 | |
| Enterprise Plaza | | 1980–1982 (2 years) | 756 (232.3) | 55 | |
| JPMorgan Chase Tower | | 1982–present (44 years) | 1,002 (305.4) | 75 | |

== Skylines ==
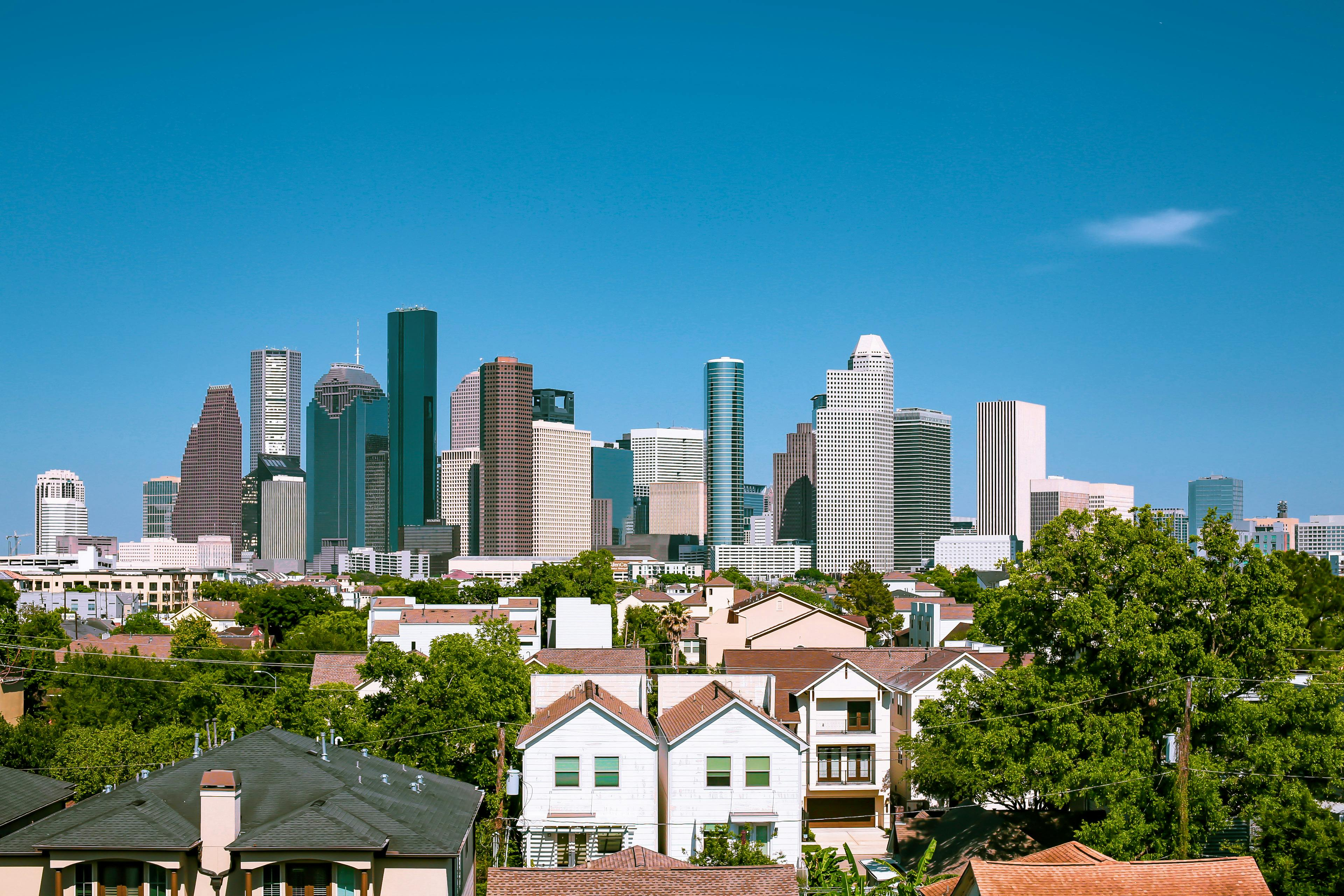
Downtown Houston

Uptown Houston

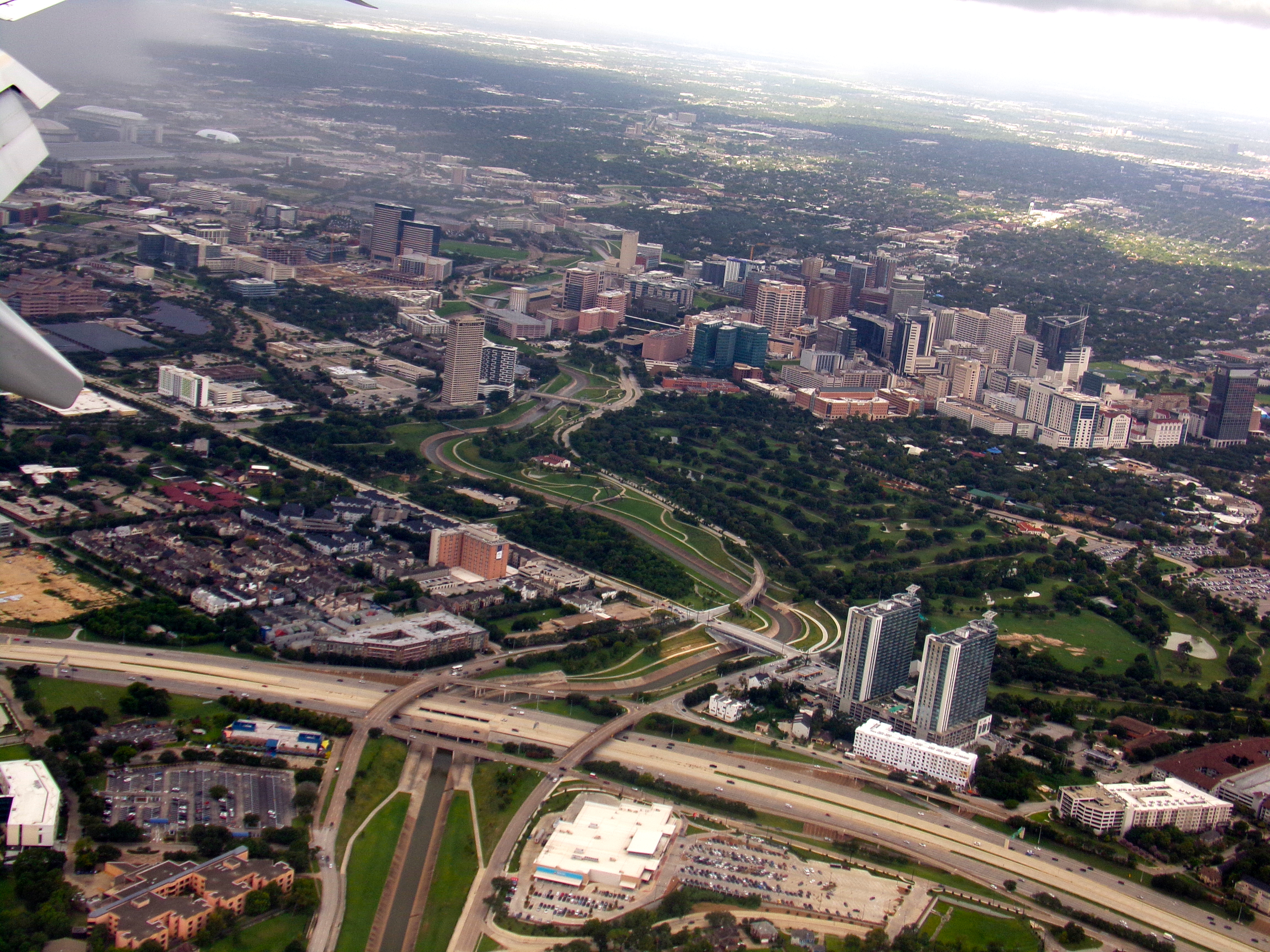
Texas Medical Center

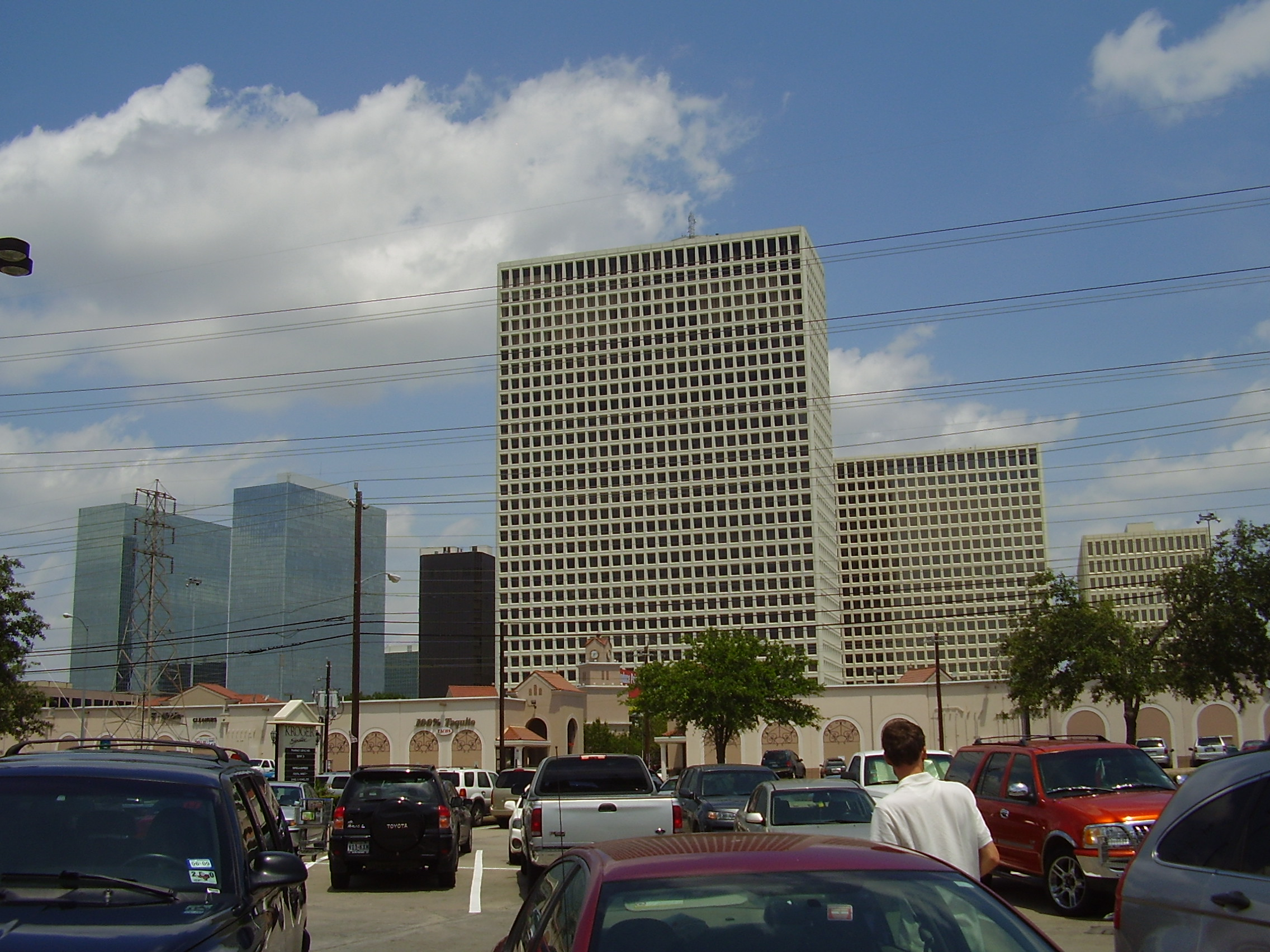
Greenway Plaza/Upper Kirby

== See also ==
- List of tallest buildings in Texas
- List of tallest buildings in Austin
- List of tallest buildings in Corpus Christi
- List of tallest buildings in Dallas
- List of tallest buildings in Fort Worth
- List of tallest buildings in San Antonio
