= One City Center =

One City Center or Centre may refer to:

- One City Centre (Bangkok), in Bangkok, Thailand
- One City Center (Durham), in Durham, North Carolina
- One City Centre (Houston), in Houston, Texas
- One City Center (Maine), in Portland, Maine
- One City Center (St. Louis), in St. Louis, Missouri
