= Texas.net =

First Internet service provider in San Antonio

Founded in 1994, Texas.net was the first Internet service provider in San Antonio and one of the first 50 Internet service providers in the United States. The privately held company initially specialized in dial-up, ISDN, dedicated LAN access, and T1 access to the Internet for both consumer and business customers. As one of the first internet providers in Texas, Texas.net initially served major Texas markets including Austin, San Antonio, Houston, Dallas, Georgetown, New Braunfels and Boerne. Texas.Net also offered several dedicated services including a news server, which was only available to customers coming from the Texas.net domain and offered over 41,000 uncensored newsgroups.

In 2002 Texas.net acquired the Internet and data operations of Reliant Energy Communications, Inc. based in Houston, Texas. The acquisition included a 15,000-square-foot (1,400 m^{2}) data center in the Marathon Oil Tower and a 10,000-square-foot (930 m^{2}) data center in Austin. Also, in 2002, Texas.net purchased assets from StratCom, a Houston based company that provided voice and data communication services for business customers in local office buildings. These acquisitions allowed the company to expand product offerings to include web hosting, colocation, network security and disaster recovery solutions. Managing a redundant network infrastructure of multiple Tier 1 backbone connections, Texas.net managed its network via Network Operations Centers located in Austin and Houston, Texas.

Texas.net was ranked among the Top 25 Private Companies on the Austin Business Journal list ranked by 2002 gross revenue.

In 2005 the company began operating as Data Foundry and currently offers Data Center Outsourcing, Managed Data Center, and Disaster Recovery services to wholesale, retail and Enterprise clients.
