= One Park Place =

Apartment high-rise building in downtown Houston Texas

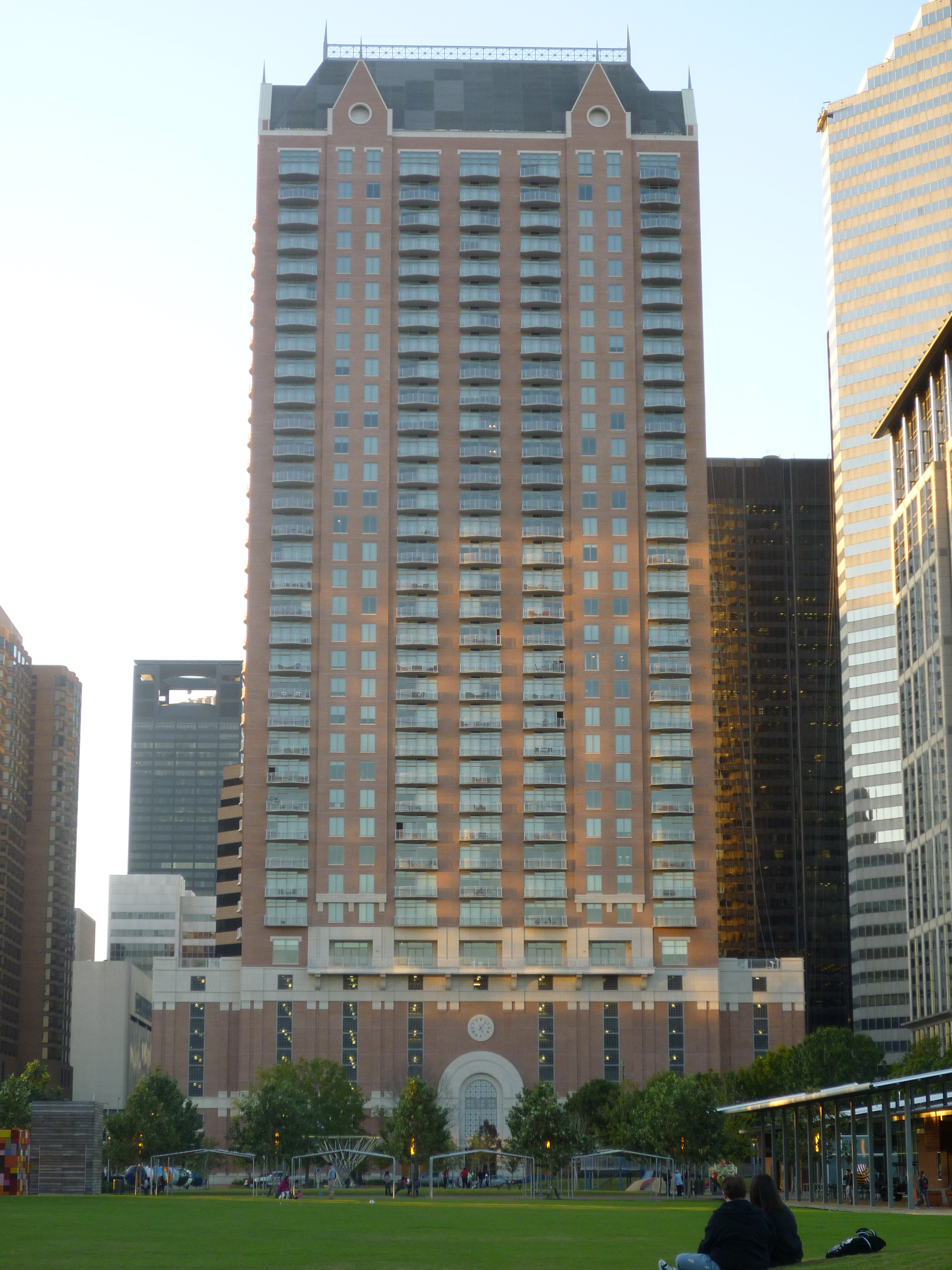
- Interactive map of the One Park Place area

General information
- Type: Residential
- Location: 1400 McKinney Street, Downtown Houston, Texas
- Coordinates: 29.7542°N 95.3611°W
- Construction started: 2007
- Completed: 2009
- Opening: May 2009

Height
- Roof: 501 ft (153 m)

Technical details
- Floor count: 37
- Floor area: 62,500 sq ft (5,810 m^{2})
- Lifts/elevators: 6

Design and construction
- Architects: Jackson & Ryan Architects

References
- The Finger Companies

One Park Place is a 501 ft (153 m) tall apartment building located adjacent to Discovery Green park in downtown Houston, Texas. Completed by The Finger Companies in May 2009, the building has 340 units on 30 floors with a total height of 501 feet (153 m) and 37 floors.

The building has 346 apartment units. The ground floor has retail shops and restaurants, while the six floors immediately above the ground floor have secure parking.

== Grocery store ==
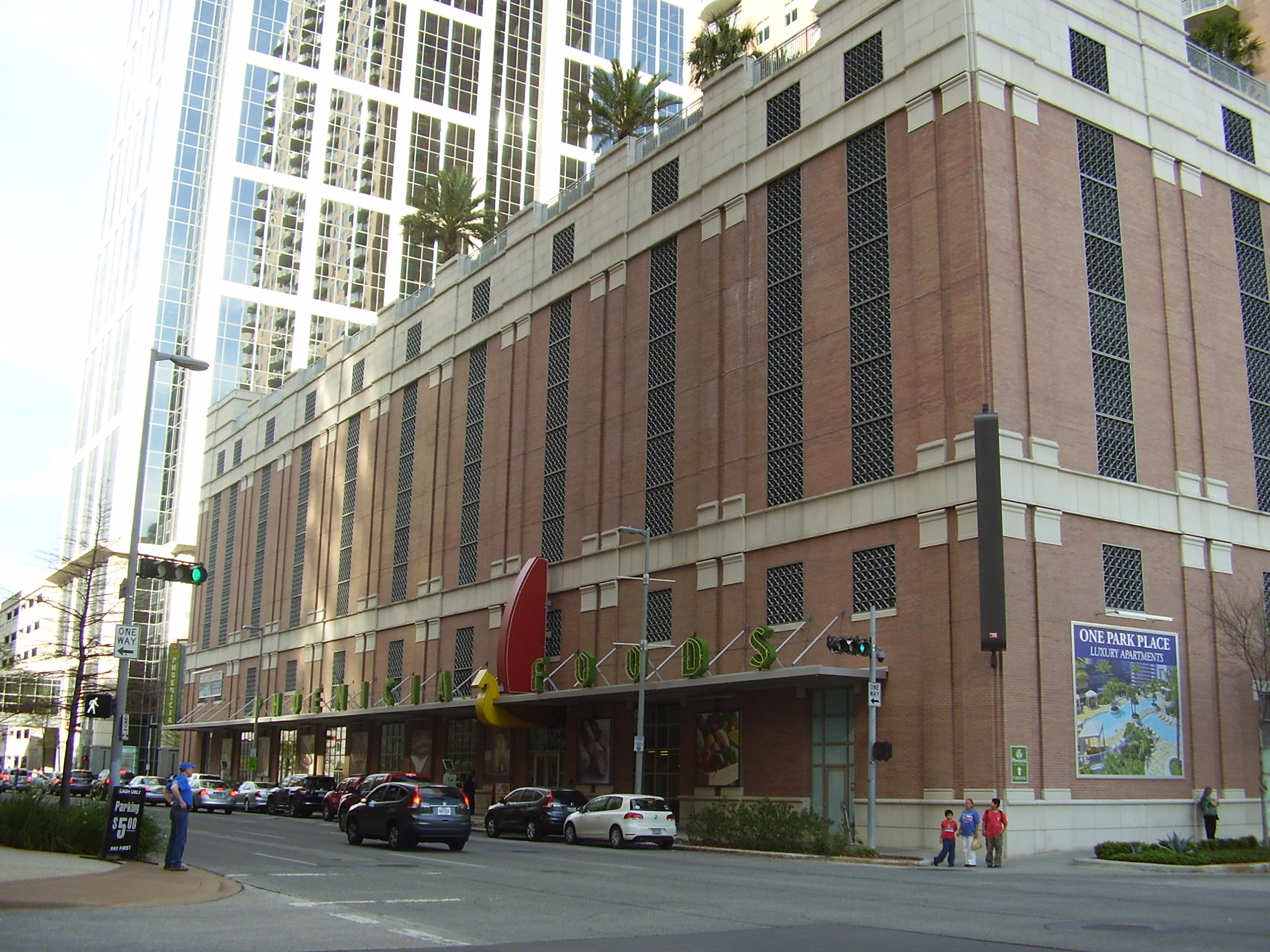
Phoenicia Foods

Phoenicia Specialty Foods opened a grocery store location in 28,000 square feet (2,600 m^{2}) of space on the ground floor of One Park Place. The Downtown location focuses on serving residents in the Downtown area by stocking staples such as bread, eggs, and milk in addition to the signature products of Phoenicia Specialty Foods. In addition the store will have a Wine Bar, a cafe, and a delicatessen to attract area workers. Katharine Schilcutt of the Houston Press said prior to the store's opening that Phoenicia will become the first major grocery store in Downtown. Zohrab "Bob" Tcholakian, the owner of Phoenicia Deli, designed the venting system, located beneath the garage and residential units at One Park Place, that allows the store to bake its own bread on-site. Tcholakian has a background of being an architect, allowing him to design the system. Shilcutt said that the facility has "ample parking" that would "surely" attract residents of the Houston Heights and Montrose to the store. The MKT Bar is located inside of the grocery store.

Before the announcement by Phoenicia occurred, rumors spread stating that Whole Foods Markets wanted to lease space in One Park Place to establish a store there. Originally the opening was scheduled for December 2010. It was moved to May 2011, but due to issues with the design of the electrical and plumbing lines, the opening was moved to July 15. By November the store opened.

== School zoning ==
The building is within the Houston Independent School District boundary. As of 2015 the building is assigned to Gregory Lincoln Education Center (Grades K-8), and Northside High School (formerly Jefferson Davis High).

By Spring 2011 Atherton Elementary School and E.O. Smith Education Center were consolidated with a new K-5 campus in the Atherton site. As a result, for middle school the building was rezoned from Smith to Gregory Lincoln. As part of rezoning for the 2014-2015 school year, this tower was rezoned from Bruce to Gregory-Lincoln K-8 for elementary school.

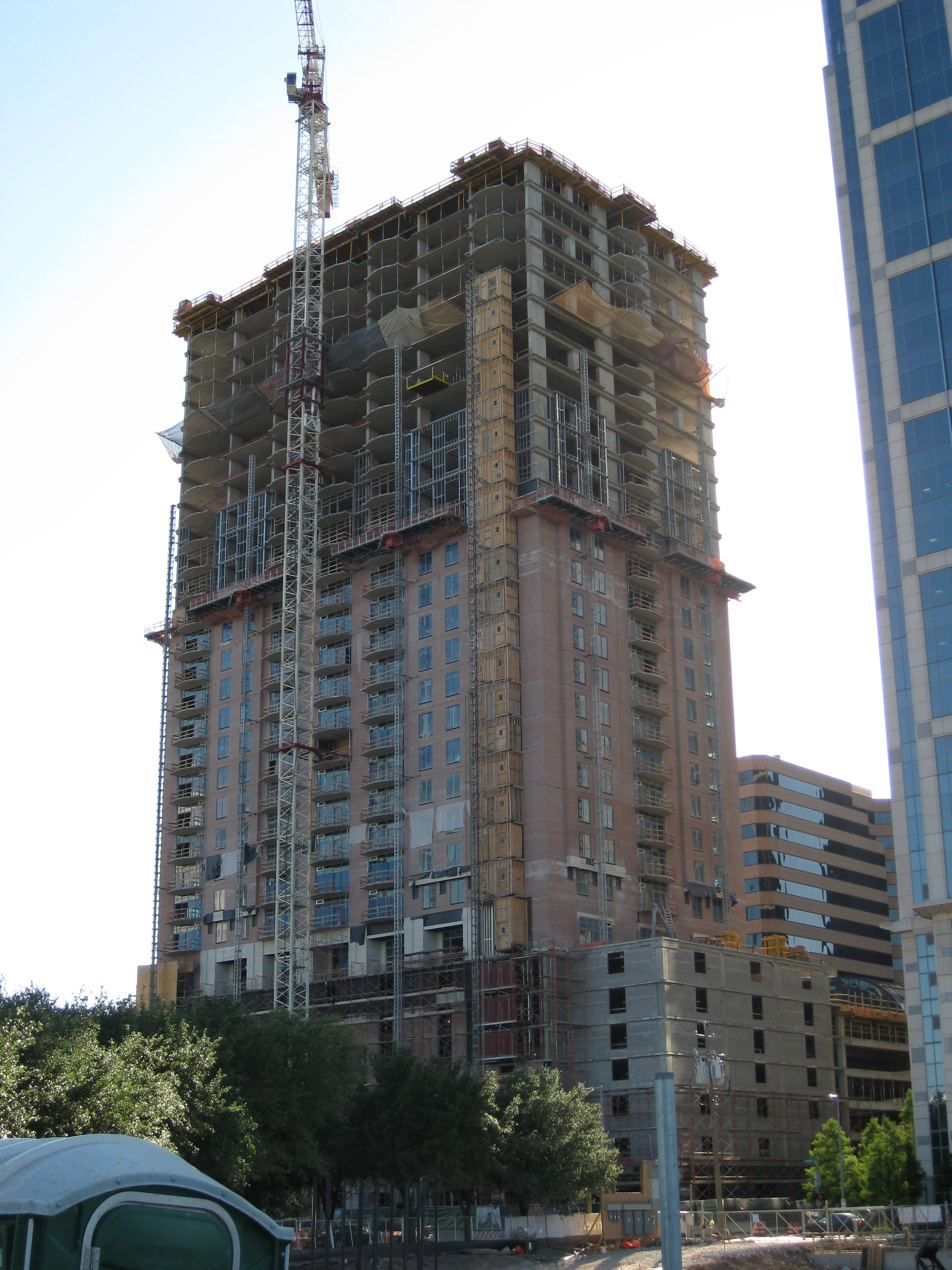
Construction as May 17, 2008

== See also ==
- List of tallest buildings in Houston
