= Calpine Center =

Skyscraper located in Houston Texas

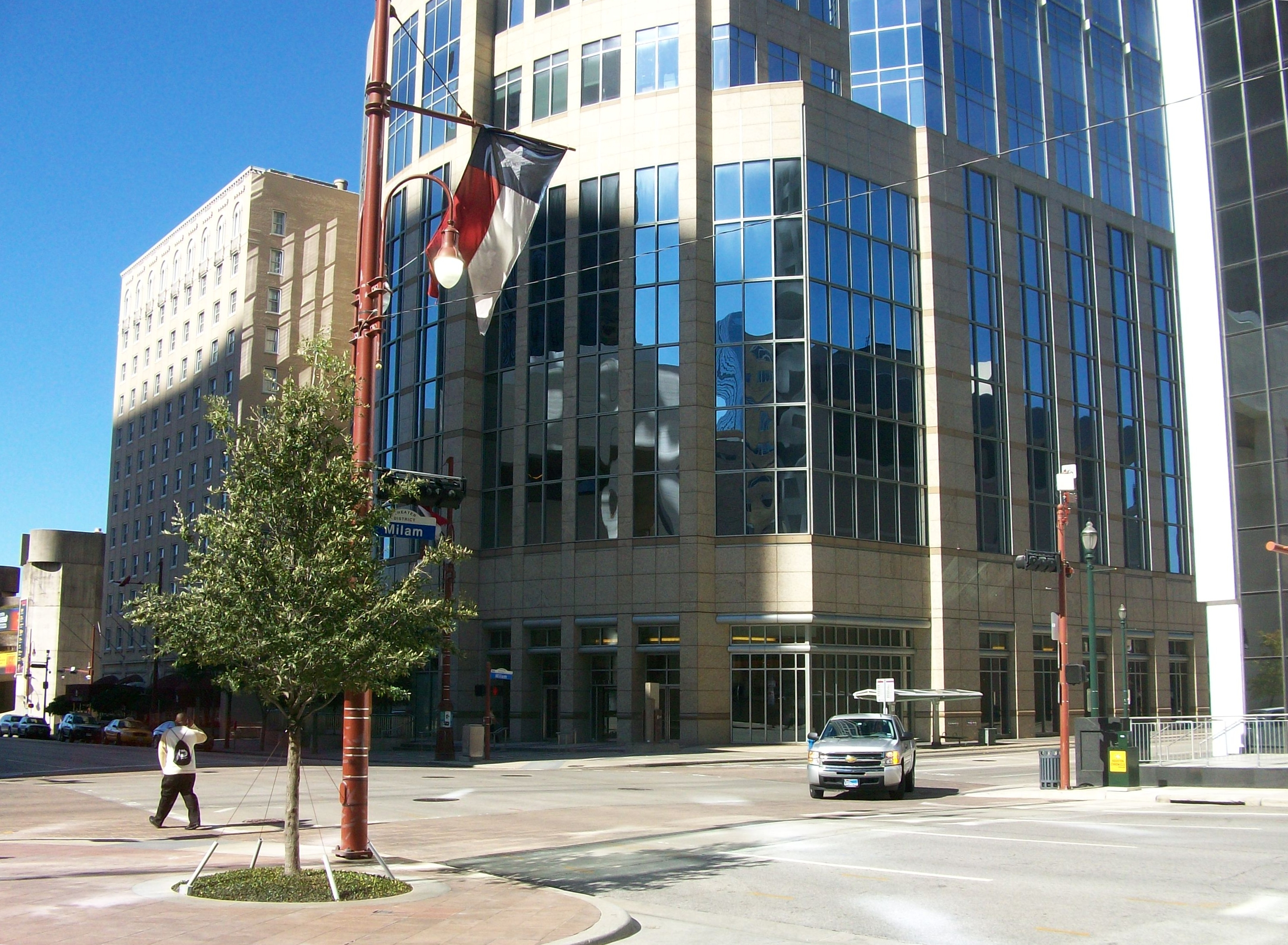
- Calpine building, corner of Milam St. and Texas St.
- Interactive map of the Calpine Center area

General information
- Type: Office
- Location: 717 Texas Street, Houston, Texas
- Coordinates: 29.7616°N 95.3643°W
- Completed: 2003
- Opening: November 10, 2003

Height
- Roof: 453 ft (138 m)

Technical details
- Floor count: 33
- Floor area: 791,135 ft^{2} (73,498.8 m^{2})

The Calpine Center is a 453 ft (138m) tall postmodern skyscraper in Downtown Houston, Texas. The building has 33 floors of Class A office space. The building has the world headquarters of Calpine Corporation. Hines and Prime Asset Management jointly developed the building. The Houston office of HOK designed the building, and Turner Construction acted as the general contractor. It is connected to the downtown tunnel system. Mark Russell of Studley, a real estate firm, said that the Calpine Center is more efficient than many of the tall office buildings built in Houston in the early 1980s.

== History ==
Originally Calpine intended to lease 300,000 square feet (28,000 m^{2}) of space. By February 2003 Calpine announced that it would sublease some of the space to other firms. The Calpine Center was scheduled for completion at the end of 2003. In July 2003 the space was 82% booked for occupation. Calpine and Burlington Resources, another energy company, leased space in the building; each company agreed to lease 250,000 square feet (23,000 m^{2}) of space. In addition Jones Day agreed to lease over 50,000 square feet (4,600 m^{2}). The building opened on Monday November 10, 2003. Other tenants that had occupied the building by its opening included Cheniere Energy Inc. and Hines's southwest region development office. In 2004 Avalon Advisors LP agreed to lease 9,385 square feet (871.9 m^{2}) of space in the building, bringing its occupancy level to 86%.

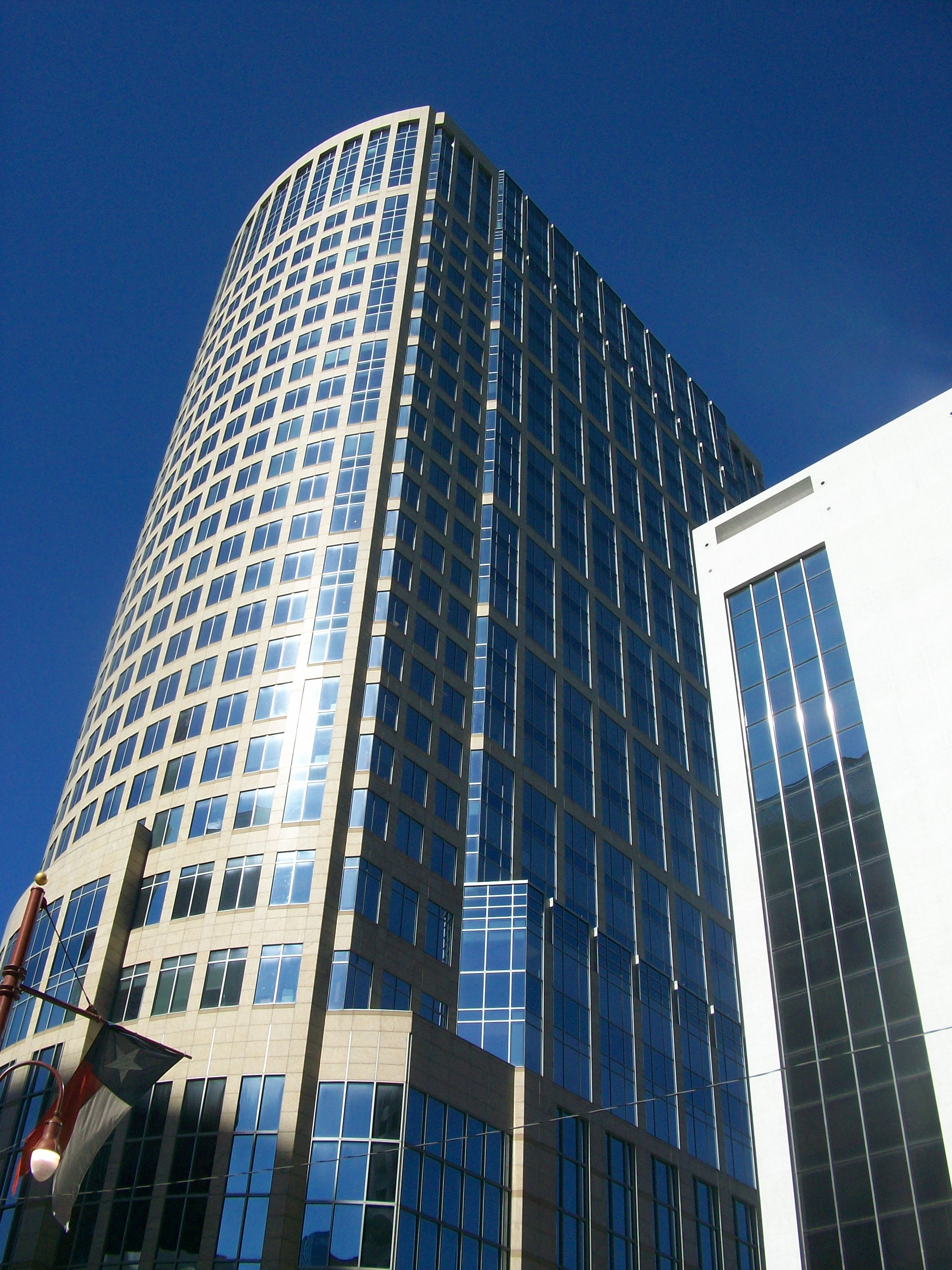
Tower, with Houston Chronicle building seen at lower right

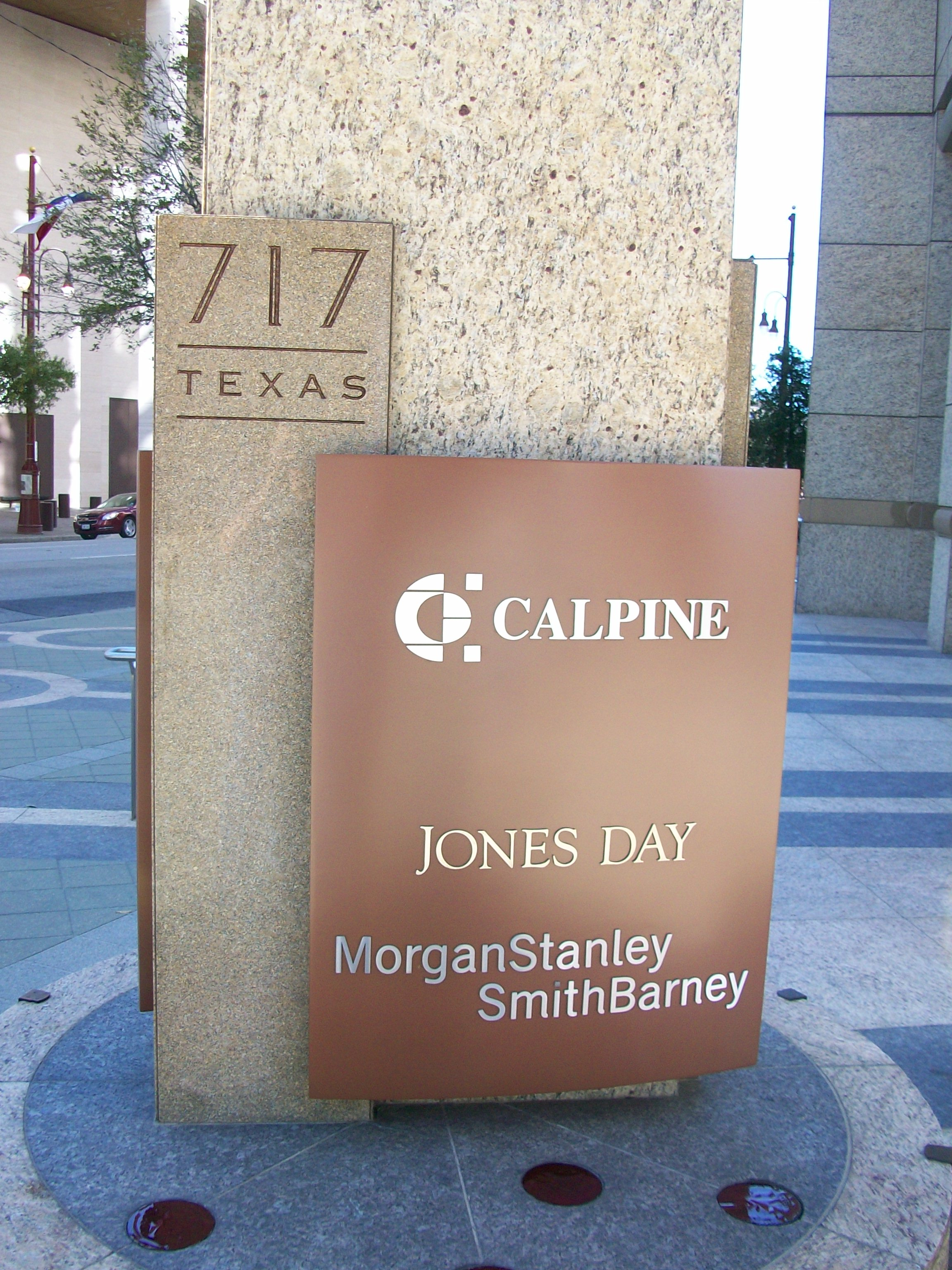
Street sign detail

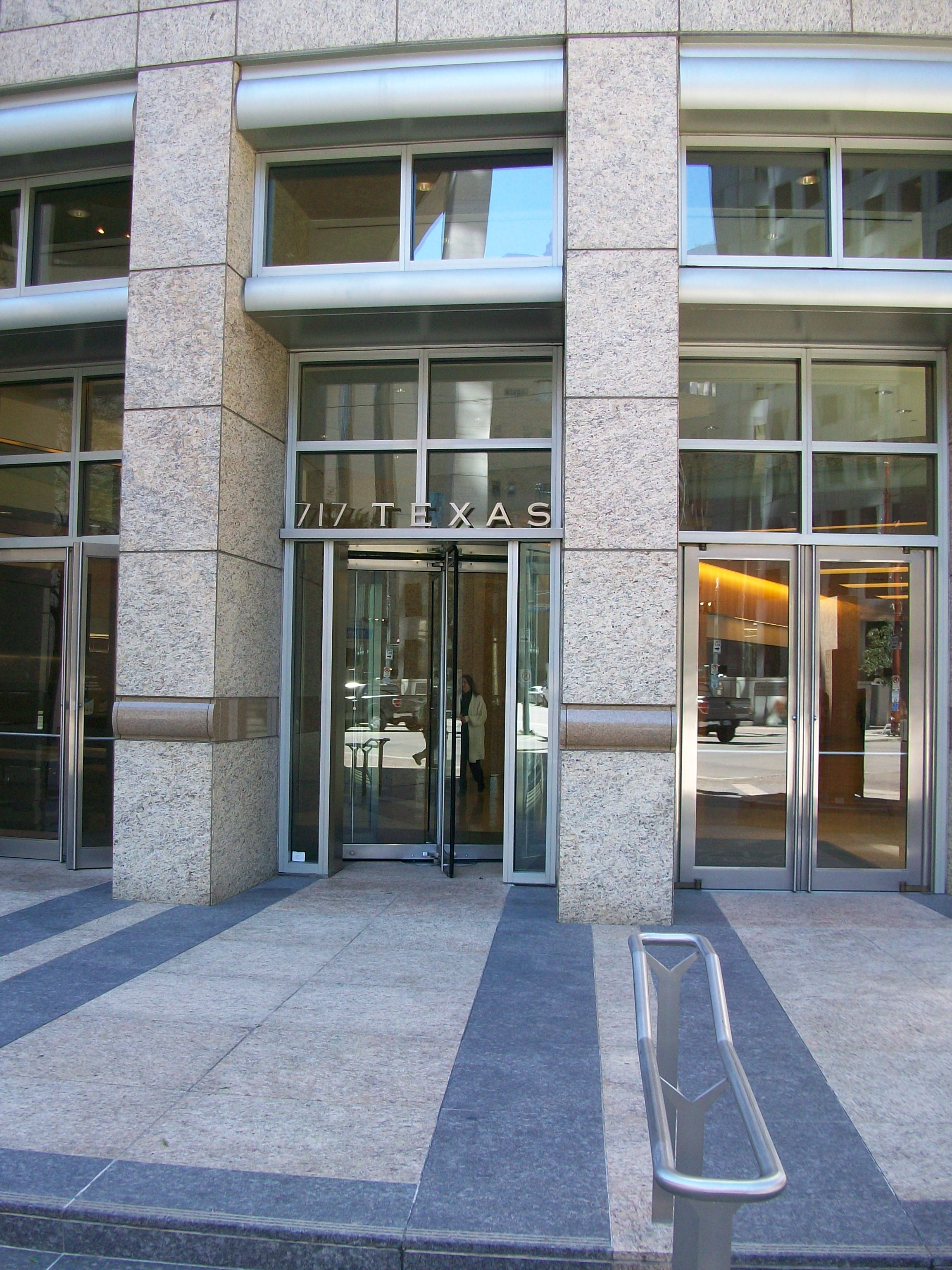
Main entrance on Texas St.

== See also ==
- List of tallest buildings in Houston
