= Wedge International Tower =

Skyscraper located in Houston Texas

WEDGE International Tower
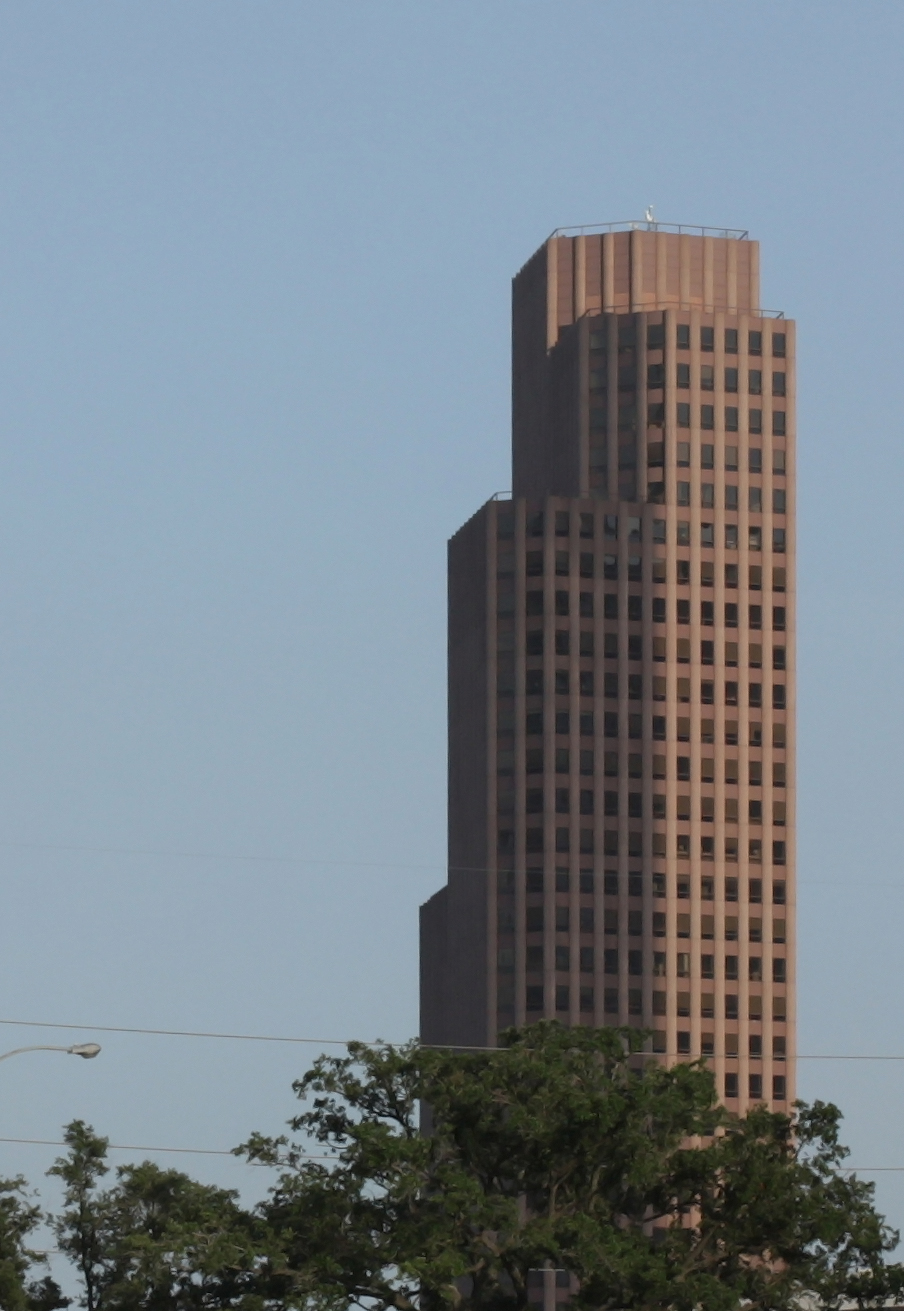
- Interactive map of the WEDGE International Tower area

General information
- Type: Office
- Location: 1415 Louisiana Street, Houston, Texas, United States
- Coordinates: 29.7548°N 95.3698°W
- Completed: 1983
- Opening: 1983
- Owner: WEDGE Commercial Properties

Height
- Roof: 551 ft (168 m)

Technical details
- Floor count: 43
- Floor area: 520,000 sq ft (48,310 m^{2})

Design and construction
- Architects: Nasr/Penton & Associates, 3D/International
- Developer: WEDGE Commercial Properties Corporation, Wortham & Van Liew
- Structural engineer: EAM Engineers
- Main contractor: W.S. Bellows Construction Corporation

Wedge International Tower, usually capitalized as WEDGE International Tower, is a skyscraper in Houston, Texas. The building was formerly known as the Southwest Bank of Texas Building, Unitedbank Plaza, and 1415 Louisiana. The building rises 551 feet (168 m) in height. It contains 43 floors, and was completed in 1983. Wedge International Tower currently stands as the 21st-tallest building in the city. The architectural firms who jointly designed the building were 3D/International and Nasr/Penton & Associates. The building is currently named after its primary tenant, WEDGE Commercial Properties; the firm purchased the building in October 1994 at a price between US$25 million and $45 million, and the structure serves as its corporate headquarters. In 1989 Exxon had office space in the Wedge International Tower.

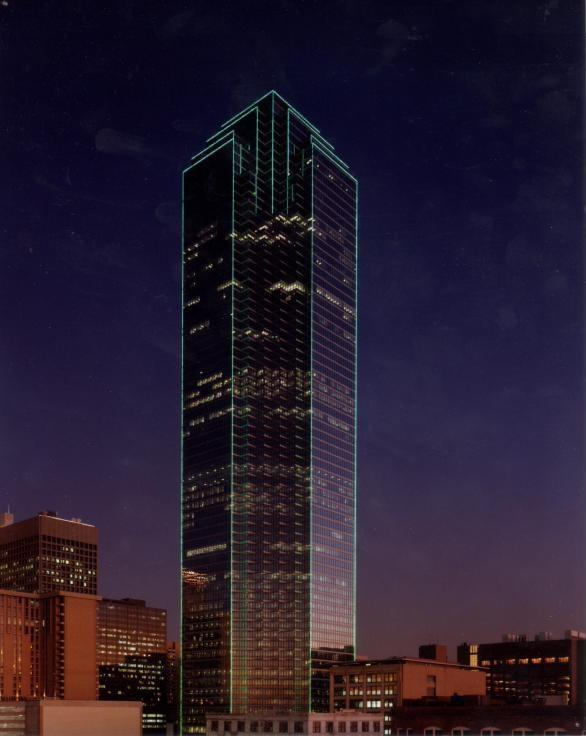
The neon green outline of Dallas' Bank of America Plaza, pictured here, inspired the lighting scheme of Wedge International Tower

Wedge International Tower is noted for having four setbacks in its shape, and for its distinctive lighting scheme, which has been in place since November 1995. The tower was once outlined by neon green-colored lights, inspired by similar lighting on the Bank of America Plaza, the tallest building in Dallas.

The 43rd story of Wedge International Tower is home to a restaurant and bar, named Strato 550; the feature is one of the highest lounges in Houston.

Wedge International Tower was the site of a fire in August 1993, which was caused by an electrical fault and damaged the upper floors of the building. There were no fatalities in the incident.

== See also ==
- List of tallest buildings in Texas
- Architecture of Houston
