= The Mercer West Tower =

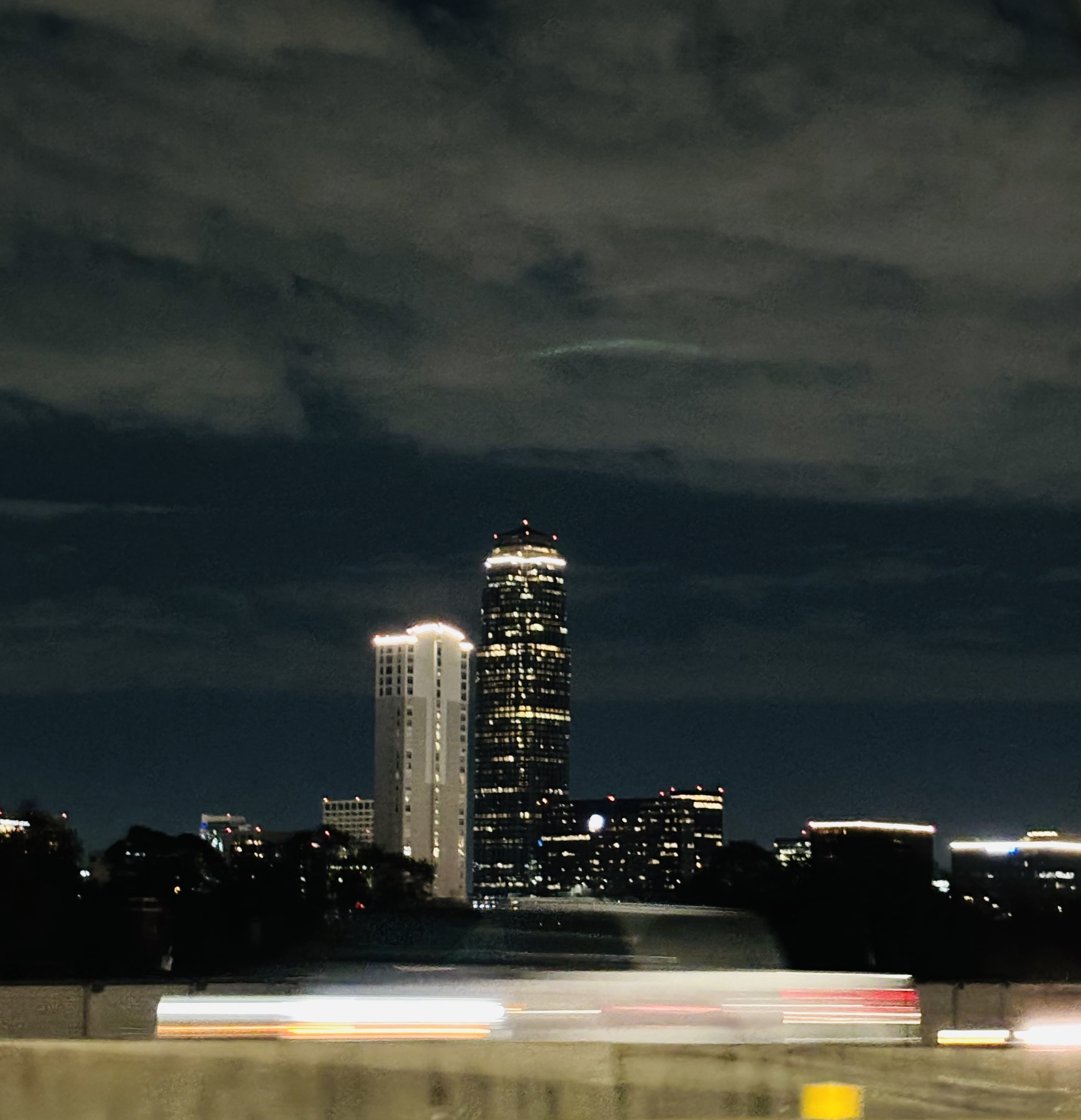
- Mercer Condo, near Williams tower, Houston, TX
- Interactive map of The Mercer West Tower

General information
- Status: Completed
- Type: Condominium
- Location: Houston, Texas; United States
- Coordinates: 29.7326°N 95.4678°W
- Completed: 2003

Height
- Roof: 401 ft (122 m)

Technical details
- Floor count: 30

Design and construction
- Architect: EDI

The Mercer West Tower is a 30-story, 401 ft (122 m) high-rise condominium building located on Sage Street in the uptown district of Houston, Texas, United States. The building is the first of two towers that are part of the Mercer Towers complex. The tower is the 45th tallest building in the city.

== Overview ==
The Mercer West Tower opened in 2003, after being constructed in less than one year. The building was designed by architectural firm EDI Architecture. Developed by Genesis Real Estate Group, Dallas, Tx. Mercer West Tower has a height of 400 ft (120 m) and contains 55 condominium units. The top five floors of the building has one 4,600-square-foot (430 m^{2}) residence with a private elevator on each level.

Originally planned as twin towers, most of the windows of the Mercer West tower face north. The windows of the planned east tower located adjacent to the west tower would have also faced north.

== School zoning ==
The building is within the Houston Independent School District boundary. The building is assigned to St. George Place Elementary School, Grady Middle School, and Wisdom High School. Residents have Lamar and Westside high schools as options.

== See also ==
- List of tallest buildings in Houston
- List of tallest buildings in Texas
