= Phoenix Tower (Houston) =

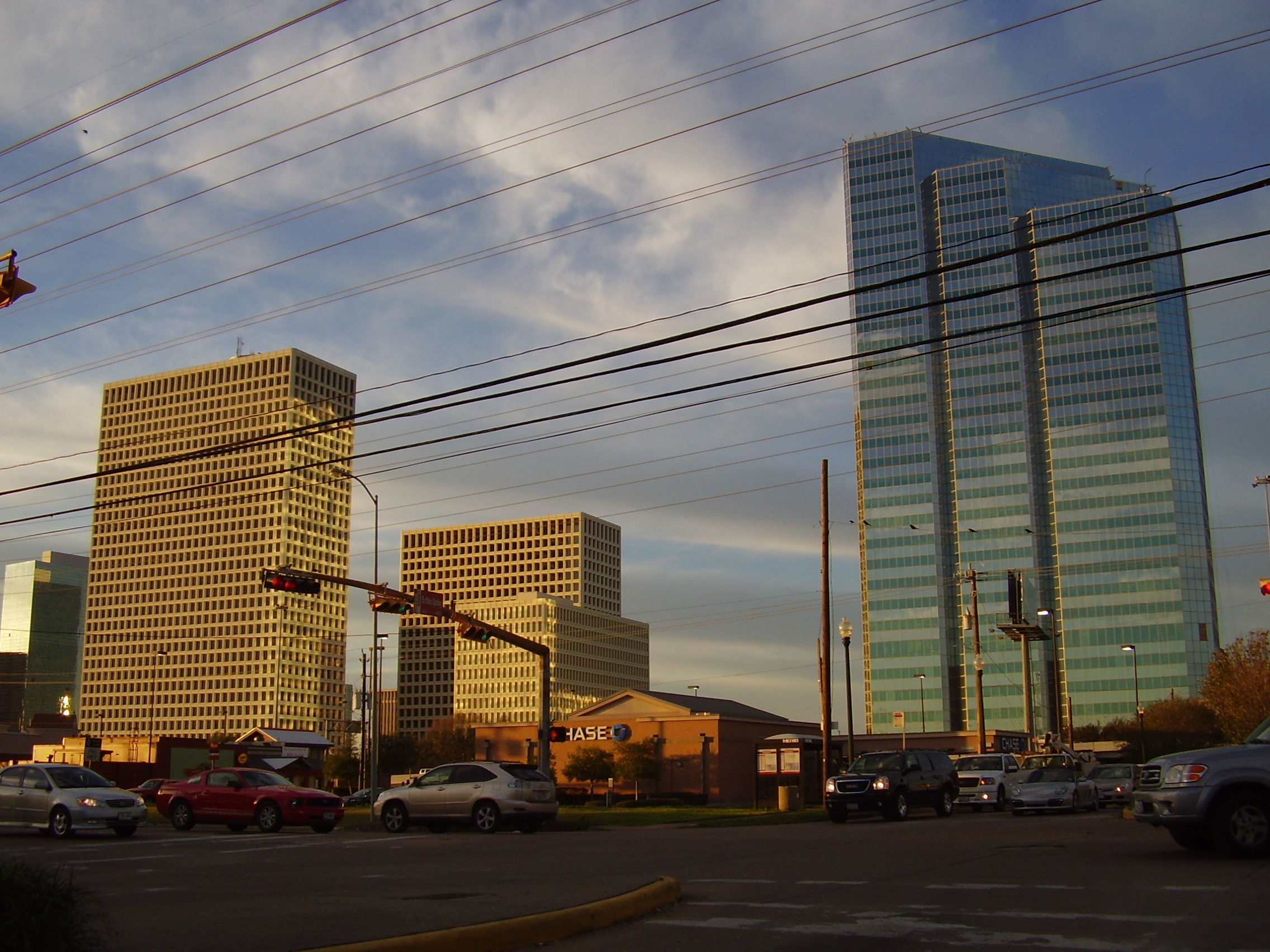
- Phoenix Tower (right), with Greenway Plaza (left)
- Interactive map of the Phoenix Tower area

General information
- Status: Completed
- Type: Office
- Location: 3200 Southwest Freeway, Houston, Texas
- Coordinates: 29.7306°N 95.4289°W
- Completed: 1984

Height
- Roof: 434 ft (132 m)

Technical details
- Floor count: 34

Design and construction
- Architect: HKS, Inc.
- Structural engineer: HKS, Inc.

Phoenix Tower is a 434 ft (132m) tall skyscraper in Houston, Texas. It was completed in 1984 and has 34 floors. It is the 36th tallest building in the city. In June 2023, Phoenix Tower was acquired by Group RMC.

The Phoenix Tower is adjacent to Greenway Plaza and located in an area between Downtown Houston and Uptown. A Jack Nicklaus-designed nine-hole putting green is on top of the building's parking garage, conceived by the building's owners as a way for tenants to relax in the middle of the day. The tower has 629,024 square feet (58,438.2 m^{2}) of office space.

Trico Marine Services, a former corporate tenant, relocated its corporate headquarters to The Woodlands. Trico maintains a minor presence in the tower. In 2009 Trico sublet 6,135 square feet (570.0 m^{2}) to the law firm Edison, McDowell & Hetherington.

The Phoenix Tower was the former headquarters for Champion Technologies. After its acquisition by Ecolab, it formed the combined company of Nalco Champion.

== See also ==
- List of tallest buildings in Houston
