= El Paso Energy Building =

Skyscraper located in Houston Texas

Kinder Morgan Building
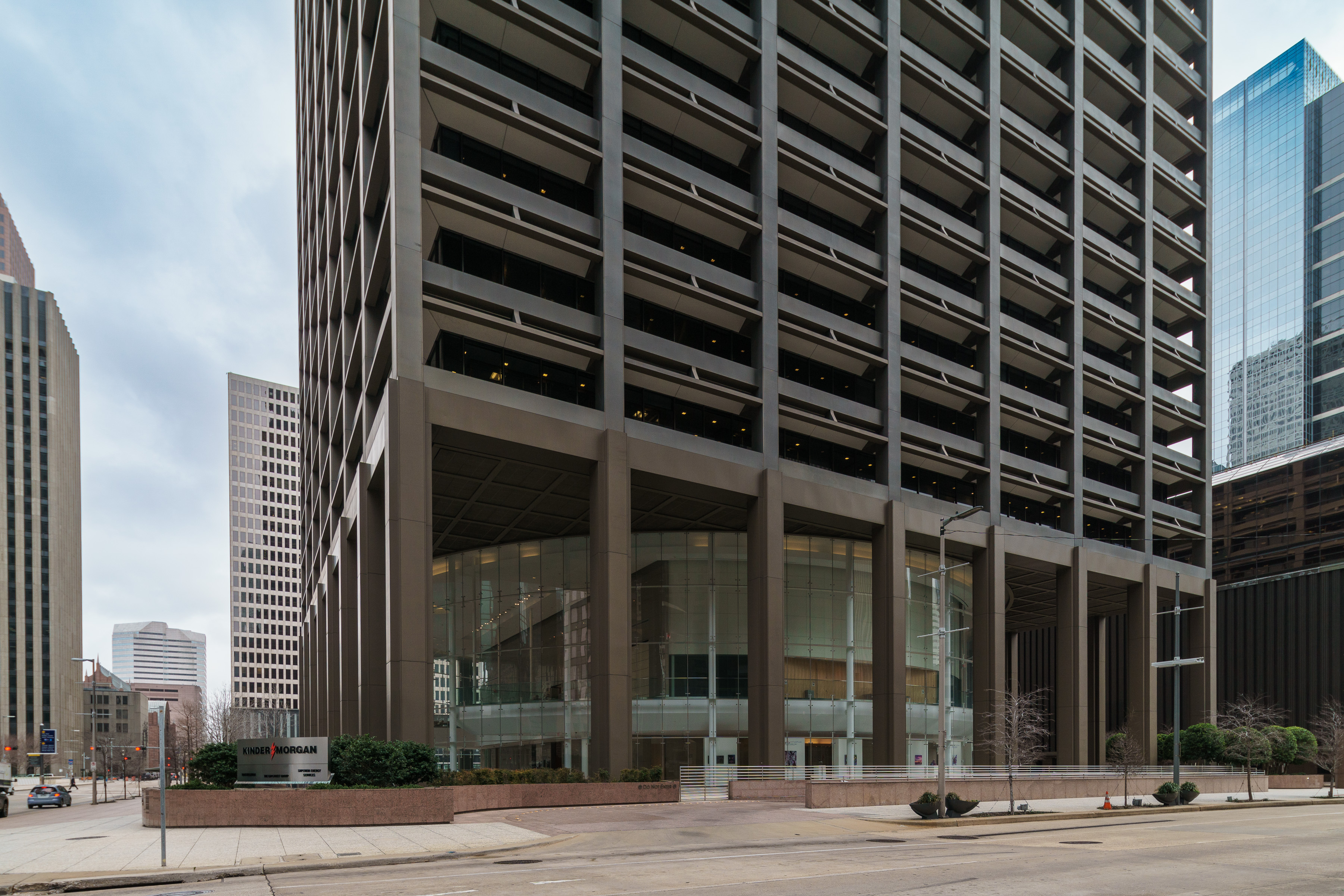
- Interactive map of the Kinder Morgan Building area

General information
- Status: Completed
- Type: Office
- Location: 1001 Louisiana Street, Houston, Texas
- Coordinates: 29.7579°N 95.3674°W
- Completed: 1965
- Owner: Kinder Morgan

Height
- Roof: 502 ft (153 m)

Technical details
- Floor count: 32
- Floor area: 1,144,000 square feet (106,300 m^{2})
- Lifts/elevators: 15+

Design and construction
- Architects: Skidmore, Owings & Merrill LLP

The Kinder Morgan Building (formerly known as the El Paso Energy Building and before that the Tenneco Building) is a 502-foot (153 m) high-rise office building/skyscraper located in Houston, Texas. It was completed in 1965 and has 33 floors. It was originally built by the Tennessee Gas Transmission Company for its Houston headquarters, and was known as the Tenneco Building. The architect was Edward C. Bassett of Skidmore, Owings, and Merrill.

== Description ==
It is the 28th tallest building in the city. Because of downtown Houston's diagonal street grid, all four sides of the building are exposed to the sun. The windows are recessed from the frame to control heat and glare from the sun. The footprint of the building is an exact square. Skidmore, Owings & Merrill LLP, the architects of the building, were recognized with an Honor Award from the American Institute of Architects in 1969. An elevator or an escalator were required to get to the main lobby of the building because it was raised above the street level. The first 5 floors of the building opened to make a huge glass-enclosed space. A number of drive-through bank kiosks along Louisiana Street were replaced with fountains in 1984.

== History ==
A very long stock ticker was installed to deliver messages and add to the visual appeal in 1996 when the El Paso Corporation bought Tenneco for 4 billion dollars. When Tenneco owned the building the letters T-E-N-N-E-C-O outlined the top of the building on each of the four sides.

In 2001, the fountains were refurbished.

In 2008, Gilbain Construction started a complete remodel of the building. It was completed in September 2011. The work was awarded by Engineering News-Record as the "Best Interior Design/Tenant Improvement Project" for the year 2012. The main lobby is located on Level 1 with entrances on Louisiana Street and Travis Street. Level 2 contains conference rooms. Levels 3 through 29 are office space and Levels 30, 31 and 32 are the Executive offices. The Exec offices boast a three-story grand stairway, boardroom, many conference rooms and spacious offices and meeting areas.

Kinder Morgan acquired the building with its purchase of El Paso Corporation in 2012. Kinder Morgan moved its headquarters to this building. EP Energy (formerly El Paso E&P Company) leases floors 18-27 from Kinder Morgan.

== See also ==
- List of tallest buildings in Houston
