= The Spires (Houston) =

Luxury high-rise condominium in Houston, Texas

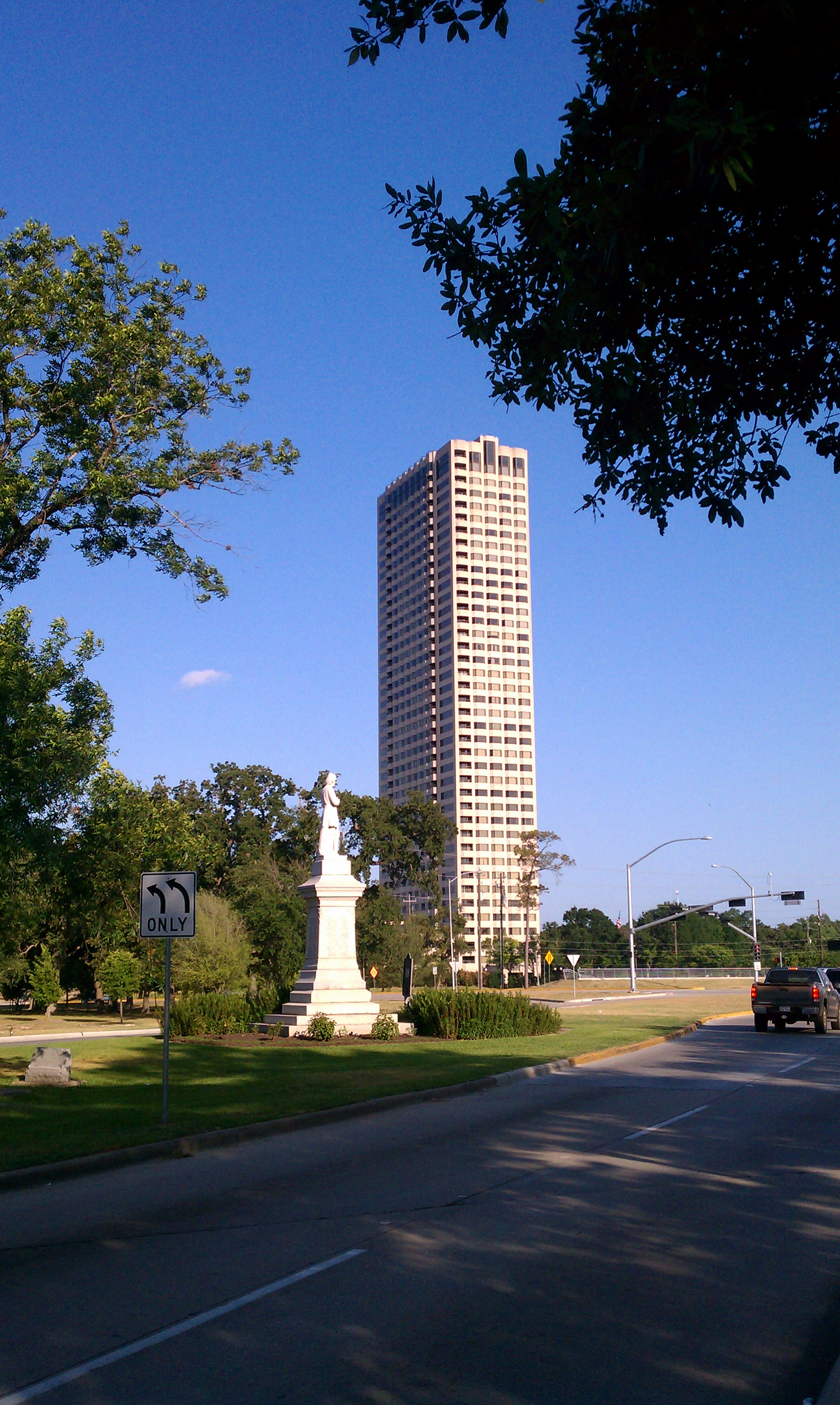
- The Spires, a 40-story residential skyscraper.
- Interactive map of the The Spires area

General information
- Status: Completed
- Type: Residential
- Location: 2001 Holcombe Boulevard, Houston, Texas
- Coordinates: 29.7071°N 95.3885°W
- Completed: 1983
- Owner: The Spires is a Homeowners Association
- Management: Giancarllo (John) Ferraro

Height
- Roof: 426 ft (130 m)

Technical details
- Floor count: 40
- Lifts/elevators: 5 (4 interior / 1 garage)

Design and construction
- Architects: HKS, Inc.

The Spires is a 426-ft. (130m) tall skyscraper in Houston, Texas. It was completed in 1983 and has 40 floors, making it the 39th tallest building in the city. It is the tallest and most prominent building in Hermann Park, and is visible from the southeast throughout the Houston Zoo. The Spires is a self managed condominium building where homeowners are involved through various committees. The Spires' Board of Directors includes 11 homeowners who meet regularly. The Spires is considered one of the best managed residential highrise buildings in Houston.

== See also ==
- List of tallest buildings in Houston
