= Franklin Lofts =

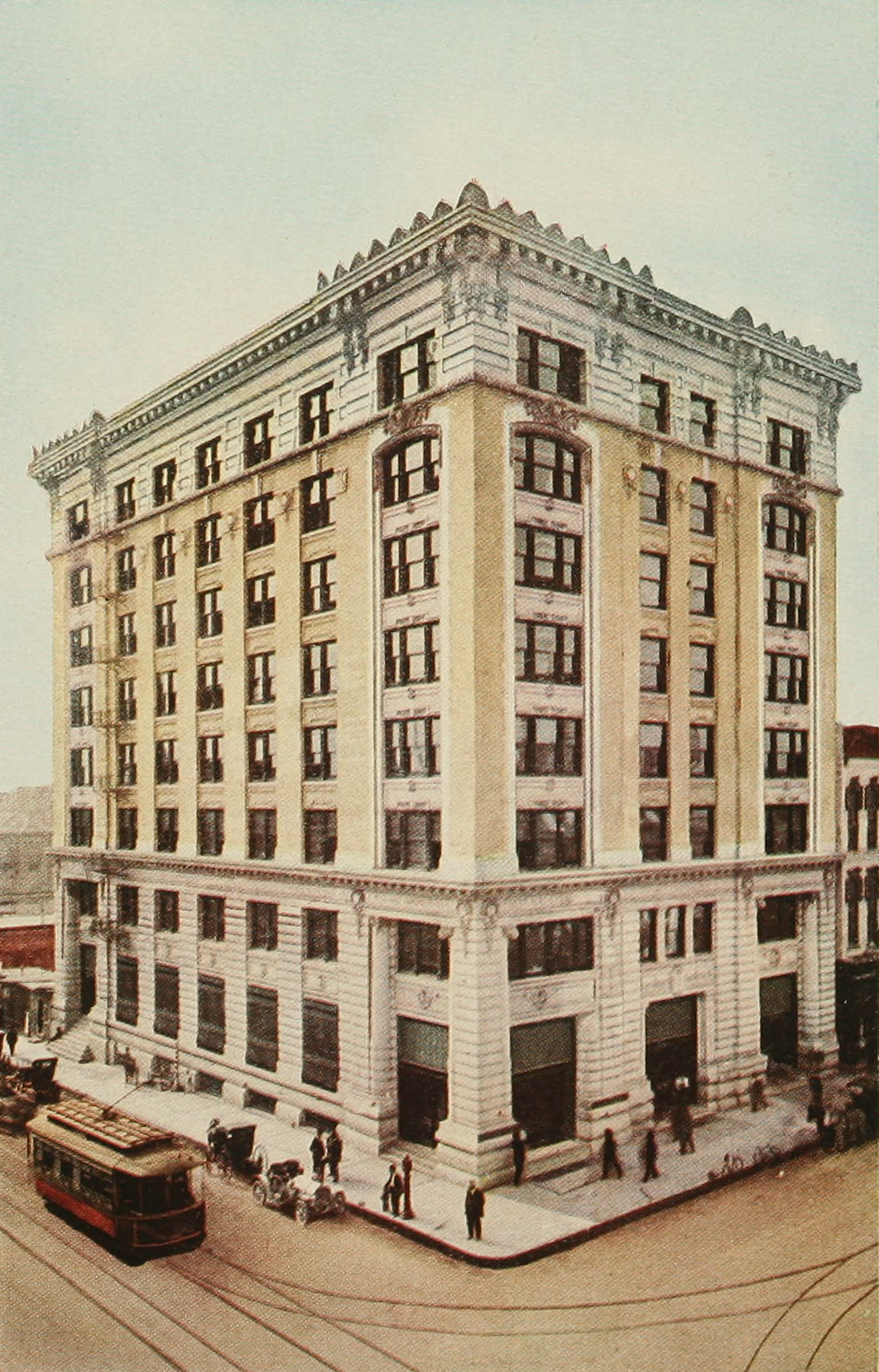
- 1913 view - Prior to 1925 addition
- Interactive map of the Franklin Lofts area
- Former names: Lomas & Nettleton Building; First National Bank Building

General information
- Status: Completed
- Type: Residential condominiums
- Architectural style: Neo-classicism
- Location: 201 Main Street; Houston, Texas
- Coordinates: 29.7628°N 95.3600°W
- Completed: 1904

Height
- Roof: 32 m (105 ft)

Technical details
- Floor count: 8
- Lifts/elevators: 3

Design and construction
- Architects: Sanguinet and Staats
- Main contractor: General Supply & Construction Company

Franklin Lofts, originally known as the Lomas & Nettleton Building, is an 8-story, 32 m (105 ft) building in downtown Houston, Texas. The building is generally regarded as the first skyscraper in the city. The Lomas & Nettleton Building was completed in 1904, and rises 8 floors in height. A new addition was completed in 1925. It was also the tallest steel-framed building west of the Mississippi River at the time of its completion.

The Lomas & Nettleton Company was originally housed in the building, but it was converted to residential lofts and renamed in 1999.

== Zoned schools ==
Franklin Lofts is within the Houston Independent School District. As of 2015 the building is assigned to Gregory Lincoln Education Center (Grades K-8), and Northside High School (formerly Jefferson Davis High).

Residents were previously zoned to Bruce Elementary School, and E. O. Smith Education Center (for middle school).

== See also ==
- List of tallest buildings in Houston
