= Devon Energy Tower (Houston) =

Skyscraper located in Houston Texas

Two Allen Center
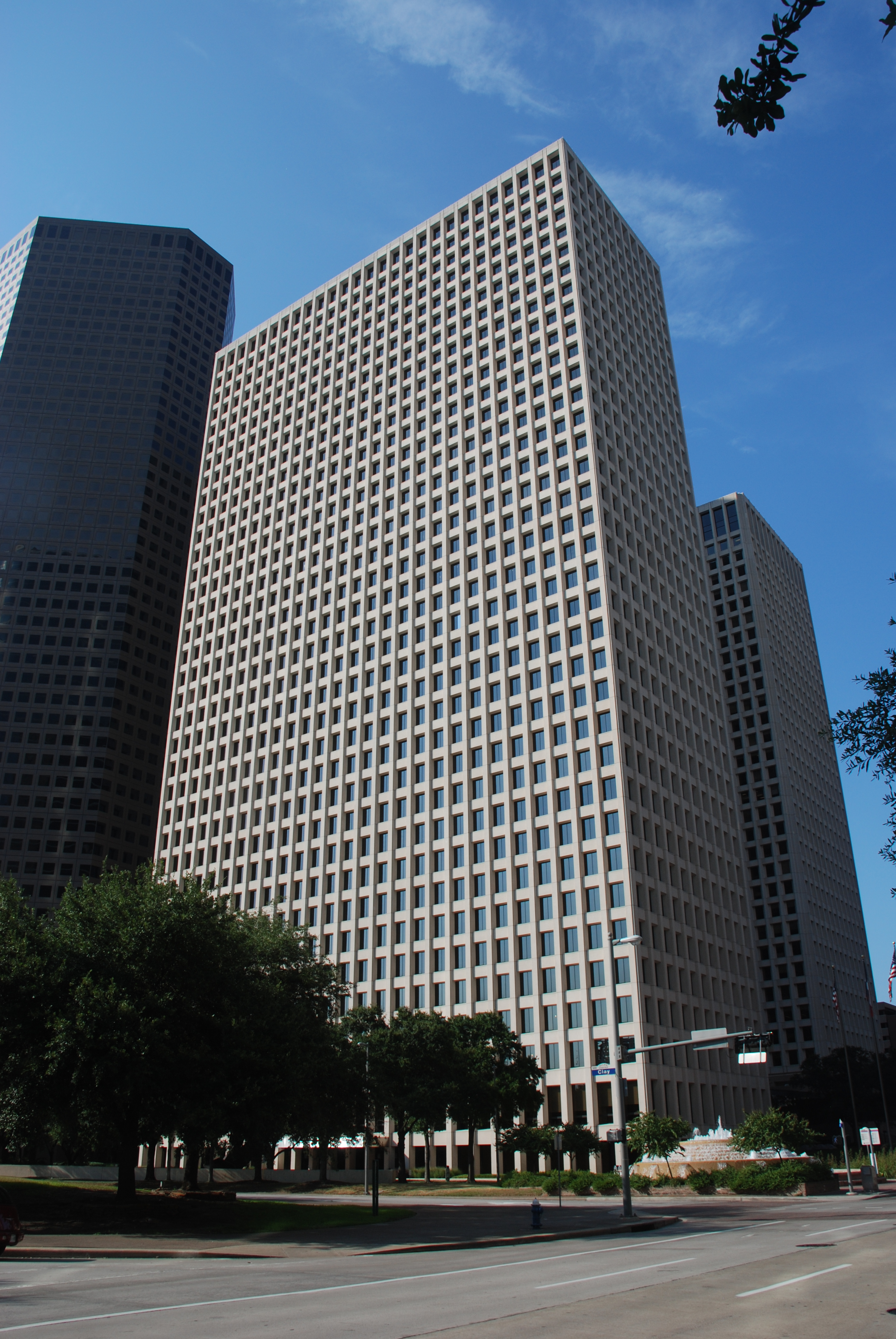
- Interactive map of the Two Allen Center area

General information
- Status: Closed
- Type: Office
- Location: 1200 Smith Street, Houston, Texas
- Coordinates: 29.7570°N 95.3708°W
- Completed: 1978
- Owner: Brookfield Properties
- Management: Brookfield Properties

Height
- Roof: 521 ft (159 m)

Technical details
- Floor count: 36
- Floor area: 1,157,010 ft^{2} (107,490 m^{2})

Design and construction
- Architects: Lloyd Jones Brewer and Associates

Two Allen Center is a 521 ft (159 m) tall skyscraper in Houston, Texas. It was completed in 1978 and has 36 floors. It is the 24th tallest building in the city.

The building has travertine flooring and is Energy Star labelled. It is owned by Brookfield Properties.

Two Allen Center hosts the headquarters of Houston-based national tax and business law firm Chamberlain Hrdlicka. Chamberlain Hrdlicka is located on the 13th and 14th floors.

It was known as the Citicorp Building in 1989. During that year Exxon had office space there.

Devon Energy had its Houston office in Two Allen Center. In October 2012 Devon Energy announced that it was closing its office there, affecting 500 jobs.

Previously Trizec Properties had its Houston offices in Suite 1100.

== See also ==
- List of tallest buildings in Houston
