= Hess Tower =

Office skyscraper in downtown Houston Texas

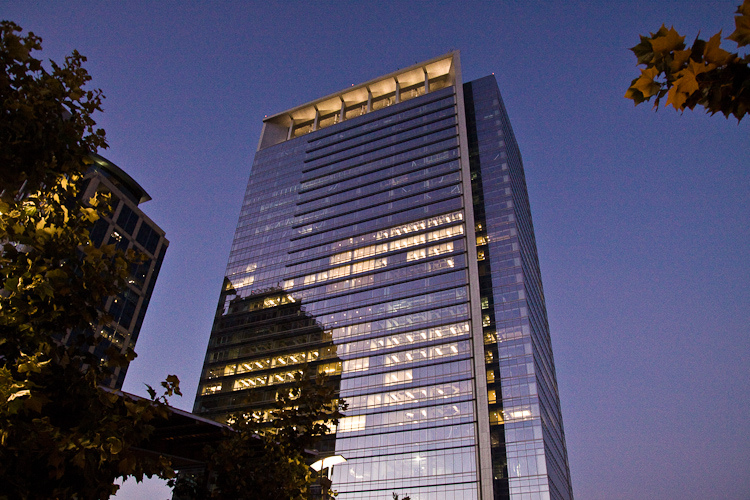
- Interactive map of the Hess Tower area

General information
- Type: Office
- Location: 1501 McKinney St, Houston, Texas
- Coordinates: 29.7544°N 95.3602°W
- Construction started: March 2008
- Owner: H&R REIT

Technical details
- Floor count: 29
- Floor area: 844,763 ft^{2} (78,481.1 m^{2})

Design and construction
- Architect: Gensler
- Developer: Trammell Crow
- Main contractor: Gilbane Building Company

Hess Tower is a 29-story building located adjacent to Discovery Green park in downtown Houston, Texas. It was formerly called Discovery Tower until Hess Corporation leased the entire tower in January 2009.

The global architectural firm Gensler designed the building. The building was a project of Trammell Crow Company, a real estate development and investment firm.

The building was originally designed to house a number of wind turbines, but the turbines were removed in December 2010.
