= 919 Milam =

General information
- Status: Completed
- Type: Office
- Location: 919 Milam Street or 910 Travis, Houston, Texas
- Coordinates: 29.7582°N 95.3661°W
- Completed: 1956
- Owner: M-M Properties of Fort Worth

Technical details
- Floor count: 24

Design and construction
- Architect: Kenneth Franzheim

919 Milam is a building in Downtown Houston, Texas completed in 1956. The building has been previously named 909 Travis, Bank One Center, and the Bank of the Southwest Building. The building occupies the entire block bounded by Milam, McKinney, Travis, and Walker streets. Ownership of the building has changed hands several times over the last twenty years.

== History ==
Bank of the Southwest hired Kenneth Franzheim to design the 24-story building which was constructed between 1953 and 1956. The building was the first in Houston with a shell composed of an "all-aluminum curtain-wall," and was the first of three buildings in Downtown Houston to be networked in the first phase of a pedestrian tunnel system. The bank commissioned Florence Knoll to design its lobby, which featured a mural by Rufino Tamayo. The bank commissioned the 13 x 45-foot painting America in 1955 and sold it to a private collector in 1993. The 735,000-square-foot (68,300 m^{2}) Bank of the Southwest Building was completed in 1956.

Aetna Insurance sold the building to Transworld Properties in 1994 for $28 million. In 1996, the owners of the Bank One Plaza released Koll Real Estate from its management contract and hired PM Realty to manage the building. On November 4, 1998, Transworld sold the building to a partnership owned by Goldman Sachs and Lincoln Property. At the time of that sale, the building, then known as Bank One Center, was ninety percent leased. Three of its major tenants were Bank One, PM Realty, and the United States District Attorney's office. In 1998 the building was 90% leased with the headquarters of PM Realty, Bank One, and the U.S. attorney's office as major tenants. Transworld Oil and its subsidiary, Transworld Properties, occupied the top two floors in 1998. Transworld Properties, which owned the building, sold it to Lincoln/-Whitehall for about $68 million during that year.

The Hines company owned 919 Milam as part of a joint venture with the California Public Employees' Retirement System for a period of less than two years prior to 2007. During that year 919 Milam was 77.5% leased. Its largest tenants were the Coronado Club, the district attorney's office, and Johnson, Spalding, Doyle, West & Trent, a law firm. In 2010 the building went back to its lender through a deed, as opposed to being foreclosed. Transwestern Investment Company acquired the building (known as 919 Milam) in 2007 for over $100 million. During the two years the Hines partnership had owned the building, it spent $11 million to renovate the lobby and built a 300-stall parking garage within the lower floors, decreasing leasable space from 735,000 square feet to 542,000 square feet.

The United States District Court for the Southern District of Texas located its offices in the building in 2009.

In 2010, M-M Properties of Fort Worth, Texas led a partnership to purchase 919 Milam for $56 million in cash. M-M Properties, the owner of record as of 2013, listed the property for sale. The building includes 543,000 square feet of leasable space, 94 percent of which was occupied as of January 2013. M-M Properties invested $3.2 million to renovate the main and elevator lobbies, improve access to restrooms for person with disabilities, and replace roofing. Another $16 million had been invested in the building since 2006 by previous owners. The building attained a Silver certification by Leadership in Energy and Environmental Design (LEED).
