= One City Centre (Houston) =

- Interactive map of the One City Centre area

General information
- Type: Office
- Location: 1021 Main Street, Houston, Texas
- Coordinates: 29.75624°N 95.36471°W
- Construction started: 1959
- Completed: 1960

Height
- Roof: 410 ft (120 m)

Technical details
- Floor count: 32
- Floor area: 70,139 m^{2} (754,970 sq ft)

Design and construction
- Architect: Skidmore, Owings and Merrill

One City Centre is a 410 ft (125 m) tall skyscraper in Houston, Texas, United States, made from glass, steel, and concrete It was completed in 1960. It has 32 floors and is the 46th tallest building in the city. Originally called the First City National Bank Building, One City Centre is the first high modern office building built in downtown Houston. Along the parking garage a message sign made of hundreds of lights flashes animations to coordinate with the evening shows of water and light along the Main Street Square fountain and light rail area.

== See also ==
- List of tallest buildings in Houston
