= Marathon Oil Tower =

Skyscraper located in uptown Houston Texas

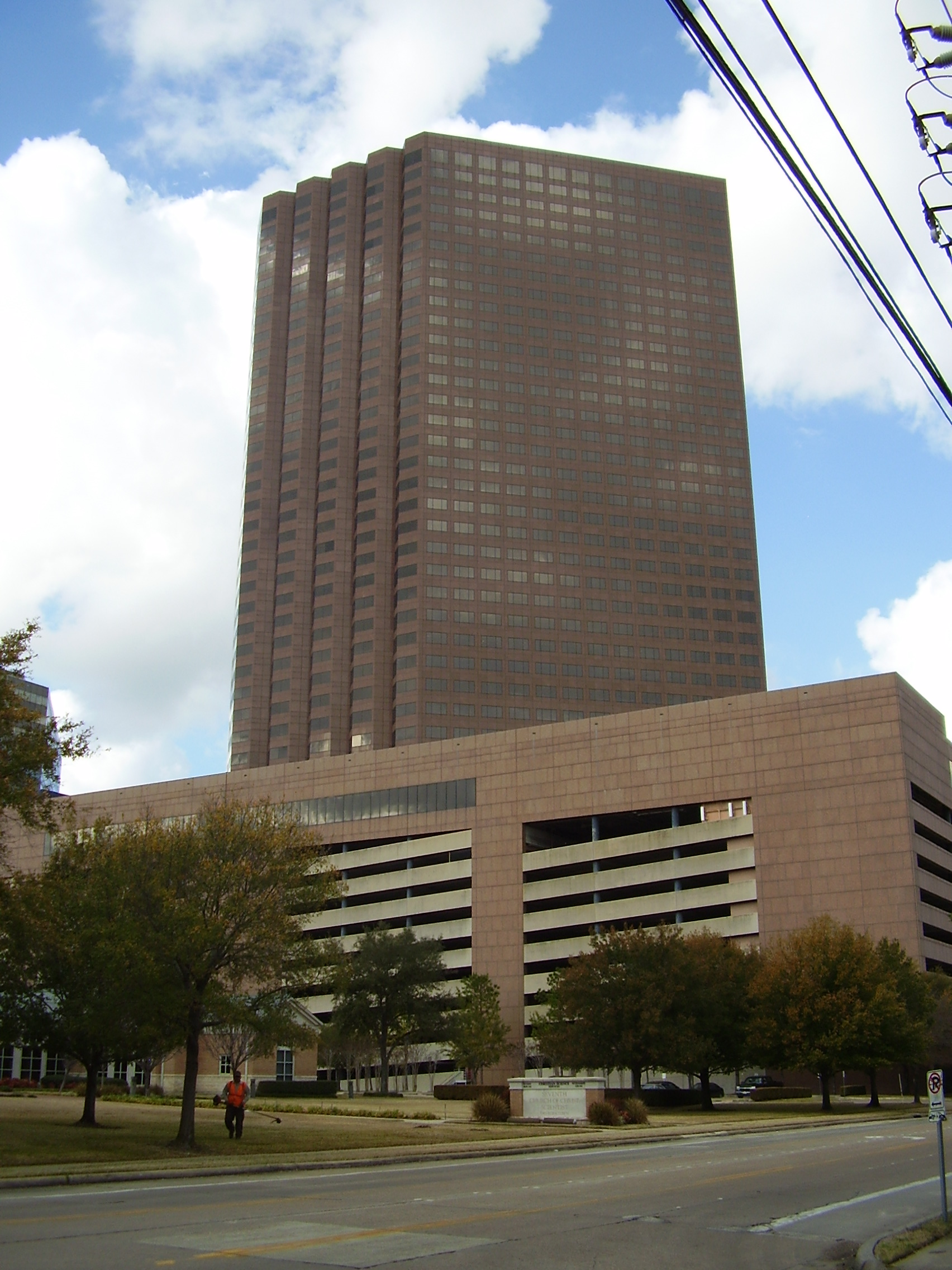
- Interactive map of the Marathon Oil Tower area

General information
- Status: Completed
- Type: Office
- Location: 5555 San Felipe Street, Houston, Texas, United States
- Coordinates: 29.7496°N 95.4718°W
- Completed: 1983

Height
- Roof: 562 ft (171 m)

Technical details
- Floor count: 41

Design and construction
- Architects: Pierce Goodwin Alexander & Linville
- Main contractor: W. S. Bellows Construction Corporation

Marathon Oil Tower is a skyscraper in Uptown Houston. The building rises 562 feet (171 m) in height. It contains 41 floors, and was completed in 1983 and construction only took 22 months. First City Tower currently stands as the 20th-tallest building in the city. The architectural firm who designed the building was Pierce Goodwin Alexander & Linville.

== Tenants ==
The building is named for American petroleum and natural gas exploration company Marathon Oil. The company was headquartered in this building for over thirty years, until it relocated in 2021. The building has since undergone a rebranding process and is now officially known as 5555 San Felipe. In addition Aon Corporation has its Houston offices in the tower.

== See also ==
- List of tallest buildings in Houston
- List of tallest buildings in Texas
- Architecture of Houston
