= Architecture of Texas =

Architecture of the U.S. state of Texas

The architecture of the U.S. state of Texas comes from a wide variety of sources. Many of the state's buildings reflect Texas' Spanish and Mexican roots; in addition, there is considerable influence from mostly the American South as well as the Southwest. Rapid economic growth since the mid twentieth century has led to a wide variety of contemporary architectural buildings.

== Traditional architecture ==
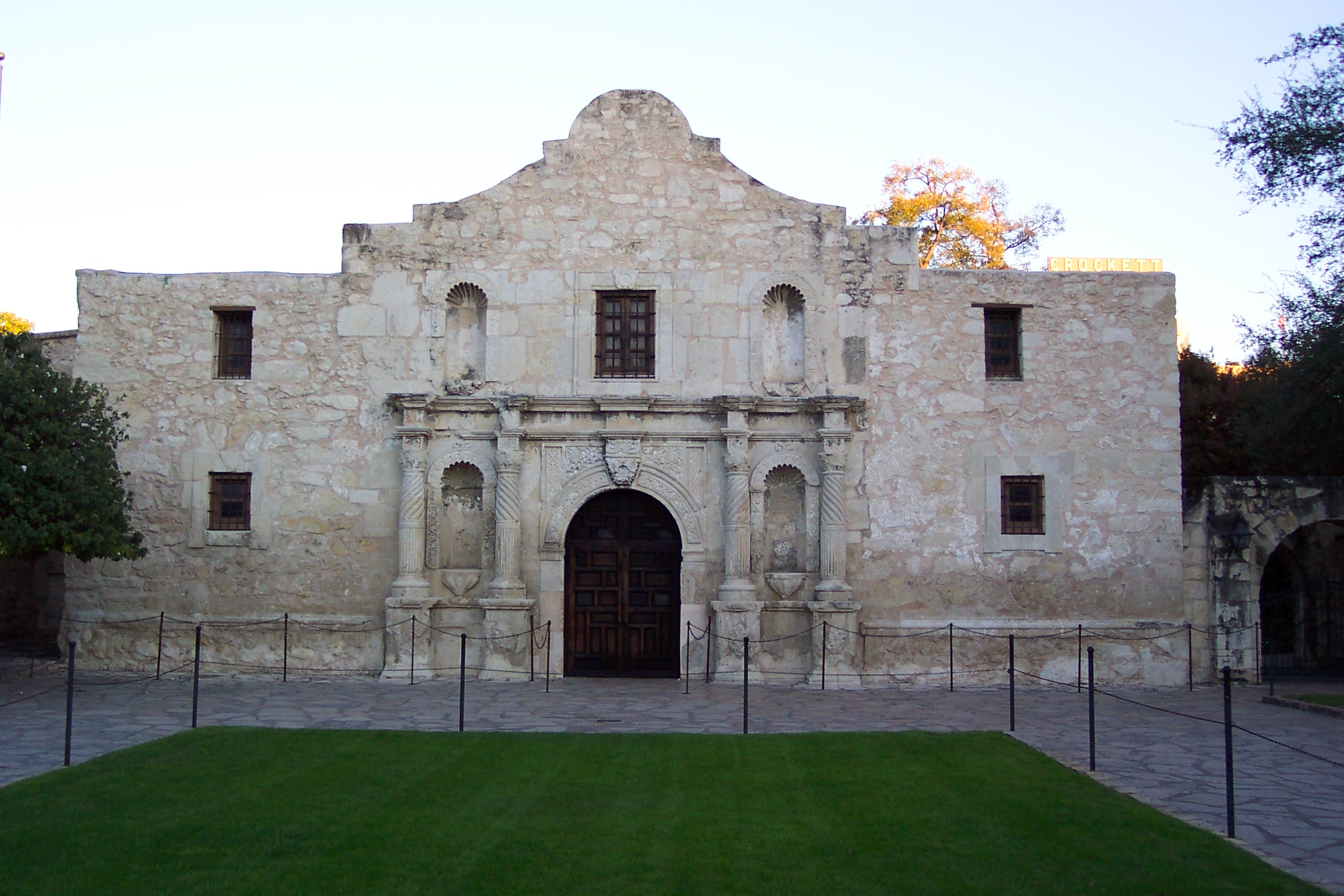
The Alamo

The first European buildings in Texas were a series of religious Spanish Missions established by Catholic Dominicans, Jesuits, and Franciscans to spread the Christian doctrine among the local Native Americans, and to give Spain a toehold in the frontier land. The missions introduced European livestock, fruits, vegetables, and industry into the Texas region. In addition to the presidio (fort) and pueblo (town), the misión was one of the three major agencies employed by the Spanish crown to extend its borders and consolidate its colonial territories. In all, twenty-six missions were maintained for different lengths of time within the future boundaries of the state. The San Antonio de Valero Mission known for the Battle of the Alamo is a prime example of this kind of architecture.

Each Texas county has a distinct courthouse. These buildings reflect many different styles of architecture.

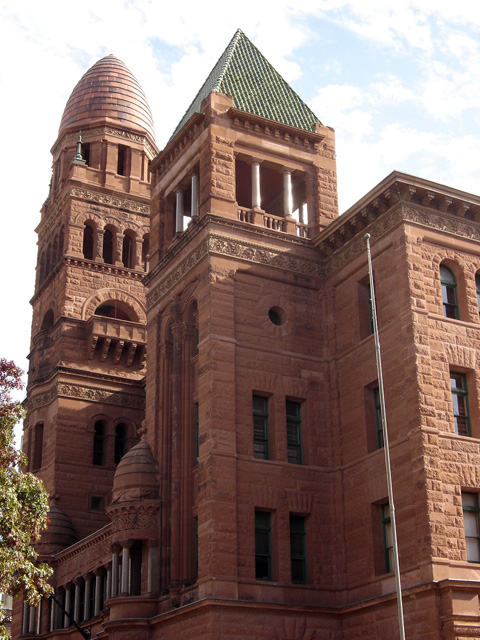
The Bexar County Courthouse by Jeff Gordon is a work of Romanesque Revival architecture from 1892.

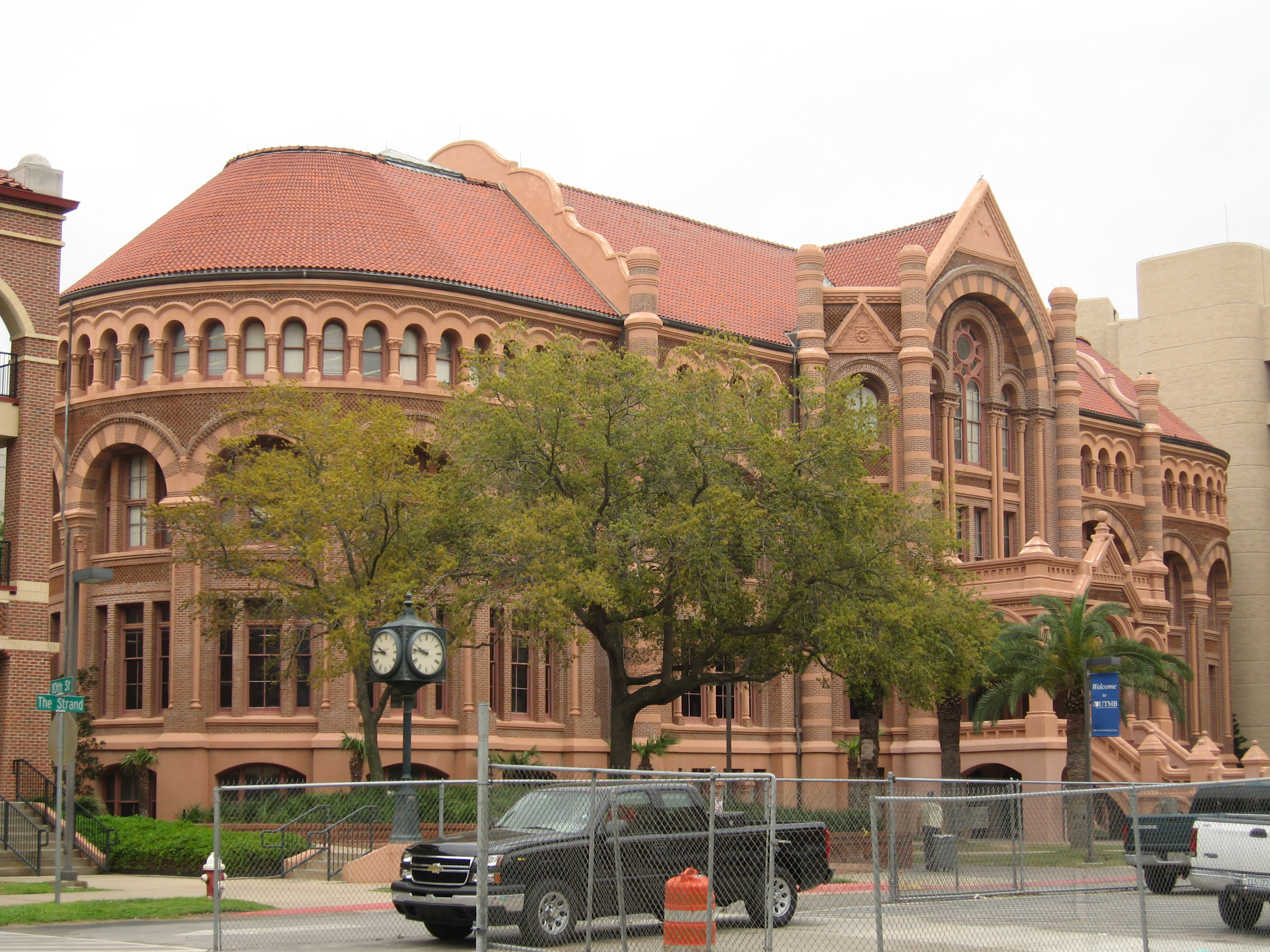
Nicholas J. Clayton's "Old Red" built in 1891, is on the campus of the University of Texas Medical Branch in Galveston and is a registered Texas historic landmark.

=== Capitol building ===
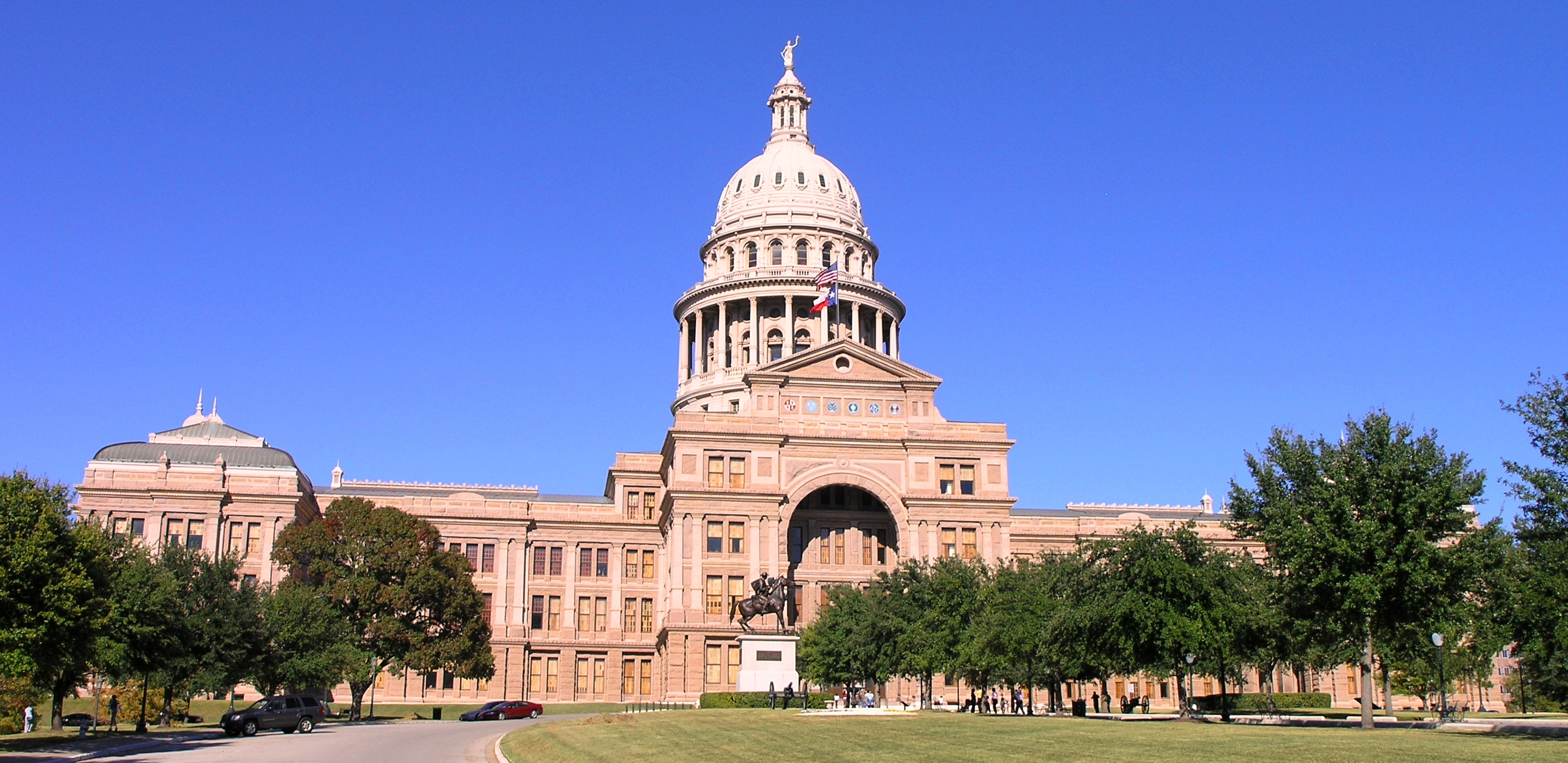
The Texas State Capitol

The Texas State Capitol, located in Austin, Texas, is the fourth building to serve as the seat of Texas government. It houses the chambers of the Texas State Legislature and the office of the Governor of Texas. Originally designed by Elijah E. Myers, it was constructed from 1882–88 under the direction of civil engineer Lindsay Walker, and a $75 million underground extension was completed in 1993. The building was added to the National Register of Historic Places in 1970 and recognized as a National Historic Landmark in 1986. It is the largest State Capitol building, but smaller than the National Capitol in Washington, D.C.

== Contemporary architecture ==
In addition to Texas's traditional architecture the state also has noteworthy contemporary buildings. Many world class architects and Pritzker Prize winners have left their enriching marks on Texan cities and landscapes. Frank Lloyd Wright had four buildings in Texas, while Tadao Ando's Modern Art Museum and Louis Kahn's famous Kimbell Art Museum are permanent landmarks of the city of Fort Worth. Other super architects such as I.M. Pei and Philip Johnson have numerous works across the state. Among their famous works one can mention the Fort Worth Water Gardens, Amon Carter Museum, Chapel of St. Basil, Morton H. Meyerson Symphony Center, and Thanks-Giving Square. In Austin, Gordon Bunshaft's Lyndon Baines Johnson Library and Museum (also a Pritzker Prize winner) is particularly noteworthy, while Steven Holl, Robert A. M. Stern, Jaime Prize, and César Pelli are other architect legends who designed buildings that grace the Dallas and Houston areas. Sir Norman Foster's Dallas Center for the Performing Arts is the latest addition to such architectural landmarks in Texas.

Some facilities even harbor the marks of multiple architects. Houston's Museum of Fine Arts for example, was designed by Pritzker Prize winner Rafael Moneo, landscape architect extraordinaire Isamu Noguchi, and the pioneering master of Modern Architecture Mies van der Rohe.

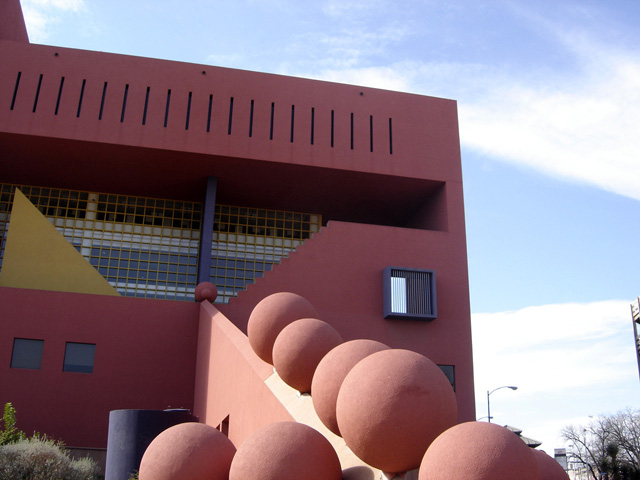
Ricardo Legorreta's San Antonio Public Library is an example of postmodern architecture in Texas.

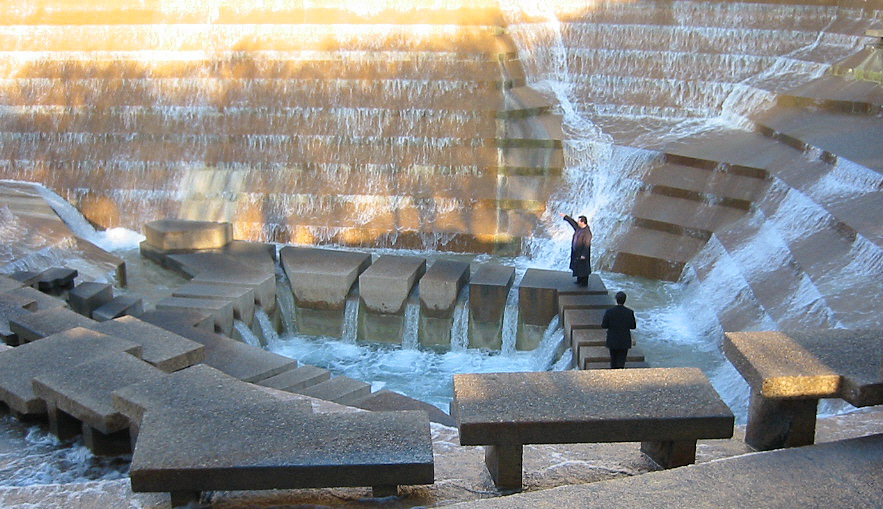
Philip Johnson's landscaping work: the Fort Worth Water Gardens.

== Skylines ==
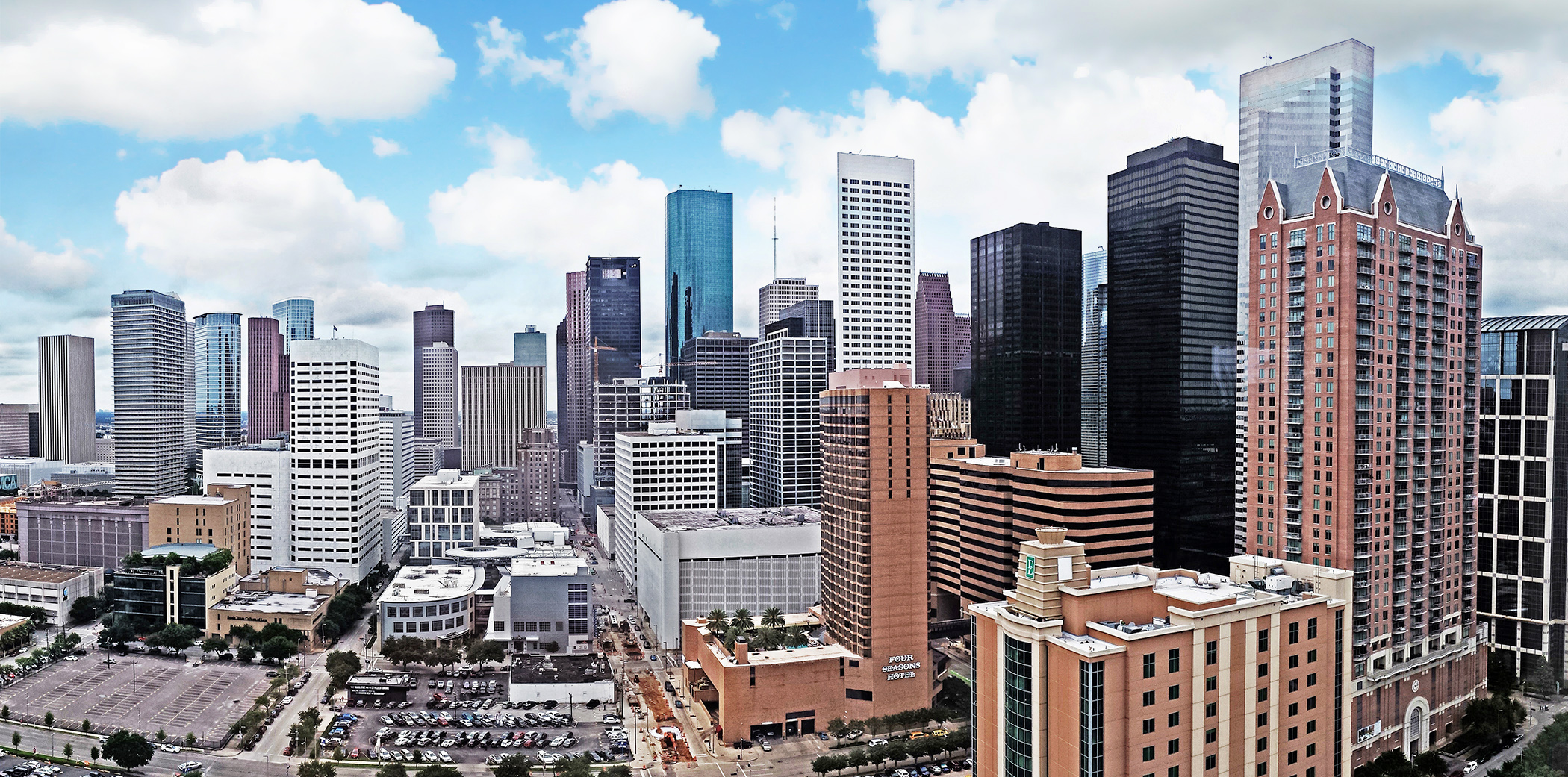
Skyline of Downtown Houston

Texas is also home to some of the tallest skyscrapers in the United States. The Houston skyline has been ranked fourth-most impressive in the United States when ranked by breadth and height, being the country's third-tallest skyline and one of the top 10 in the world; however, because it is spread over a few miles, most pictures of the city show only the main downtown area. Houston has a system of tunnels and skywalks linking buildings in downtown. The tunnel system also includes shops, restaurants, and convenience stores.

Images shown below are the eight tallest buildings in Texas.

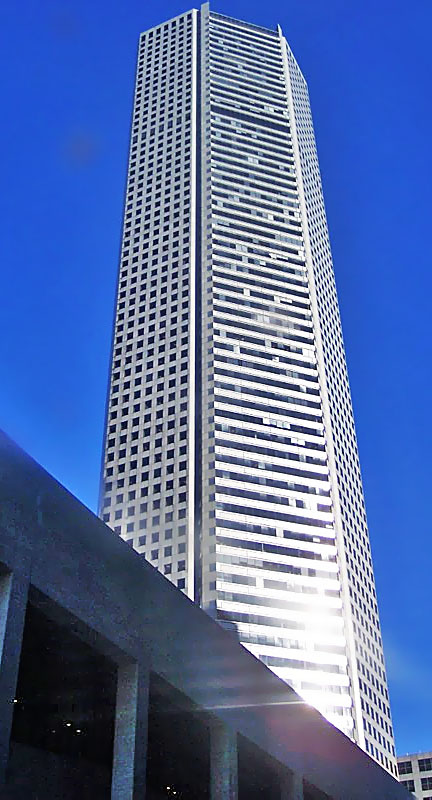
1. JPMorgan Chase Tower
Houston

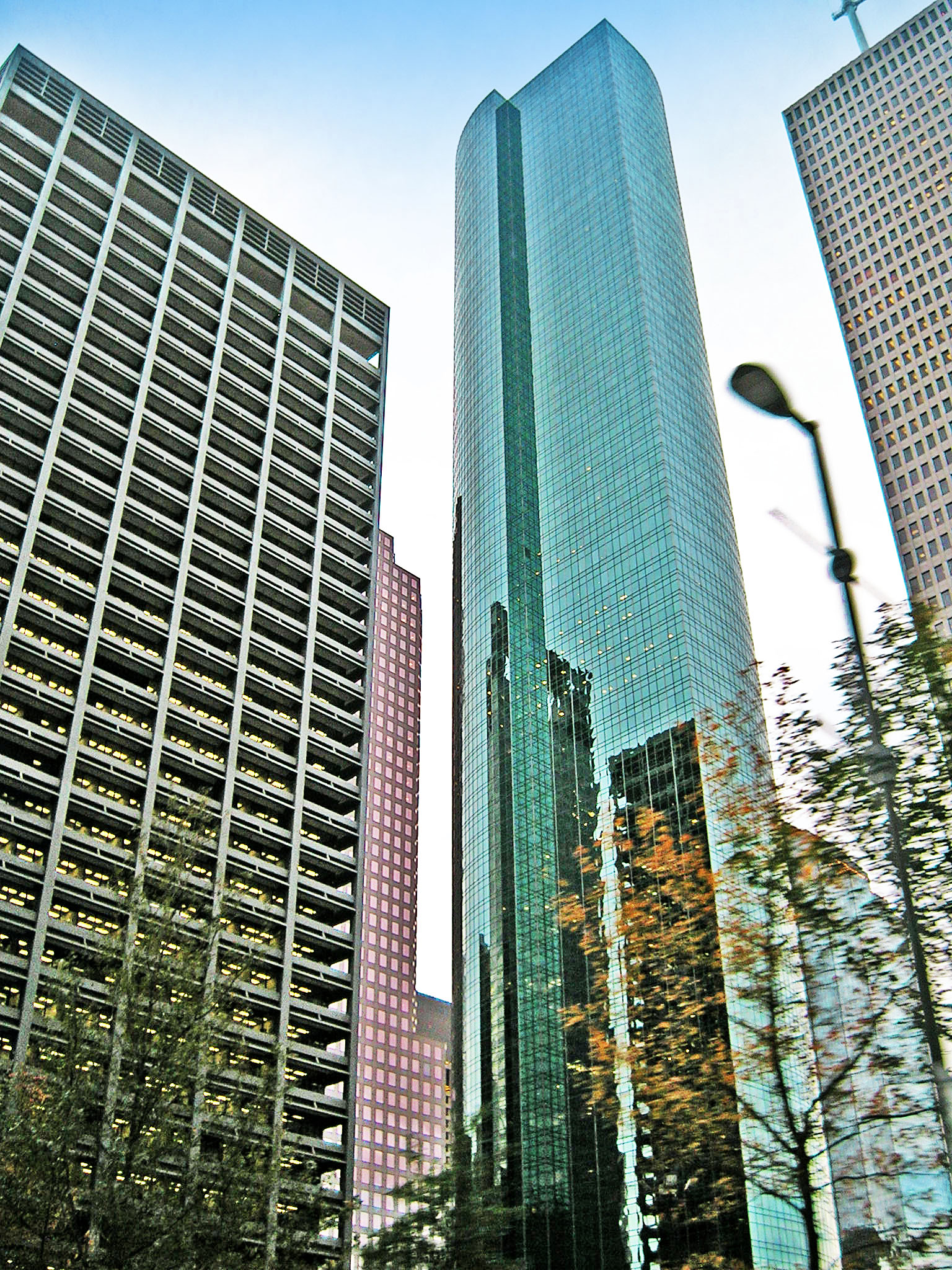
2. Wells Fargo Bank Plaza
Houston

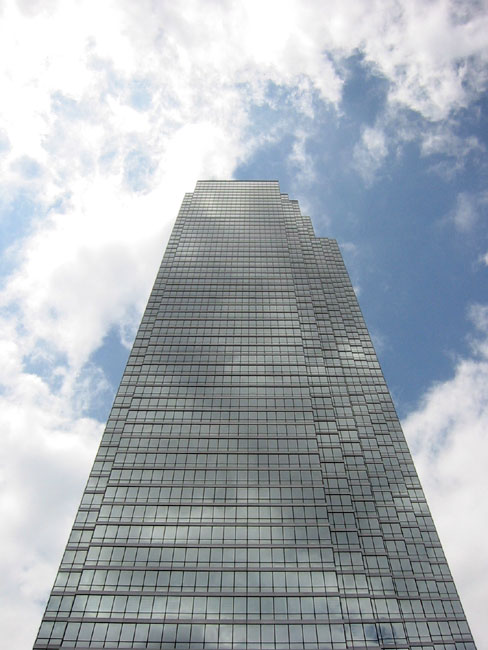
3. Bank of America Plaza
Dallas

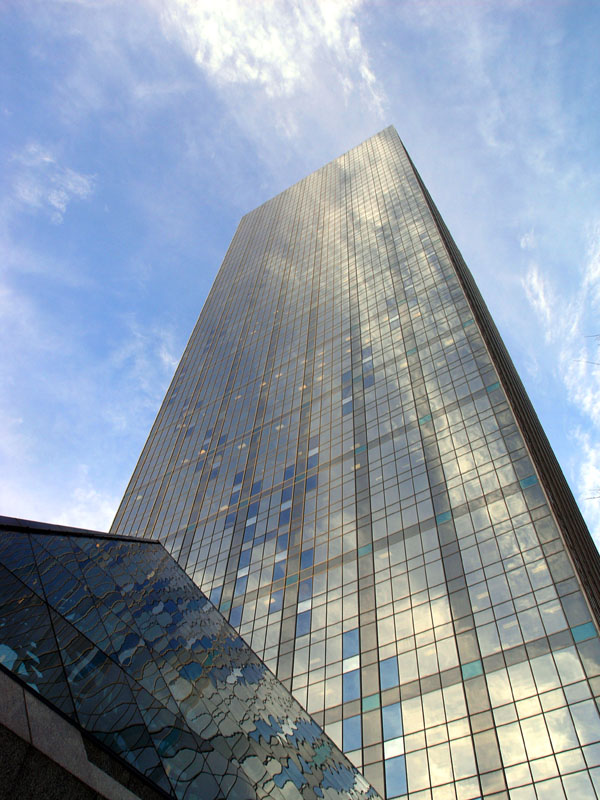
5. Renaissance Tower
Dallas

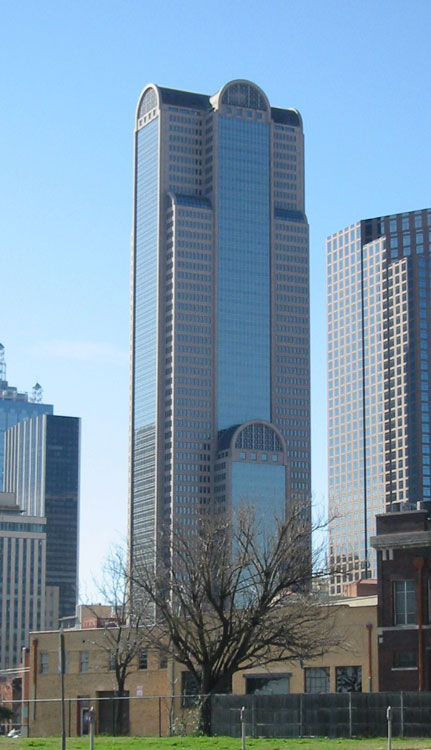
6. Comerica Bank Tower
Dallas

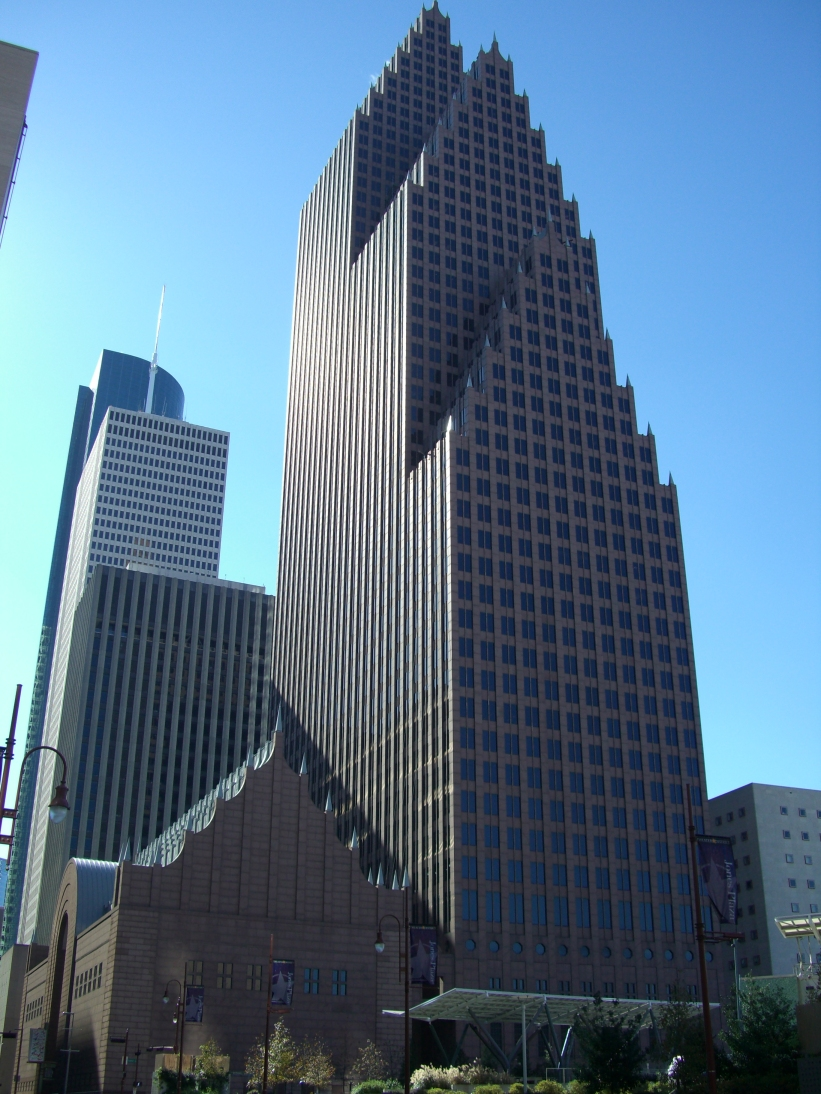
7. Bank of America Center
Houston

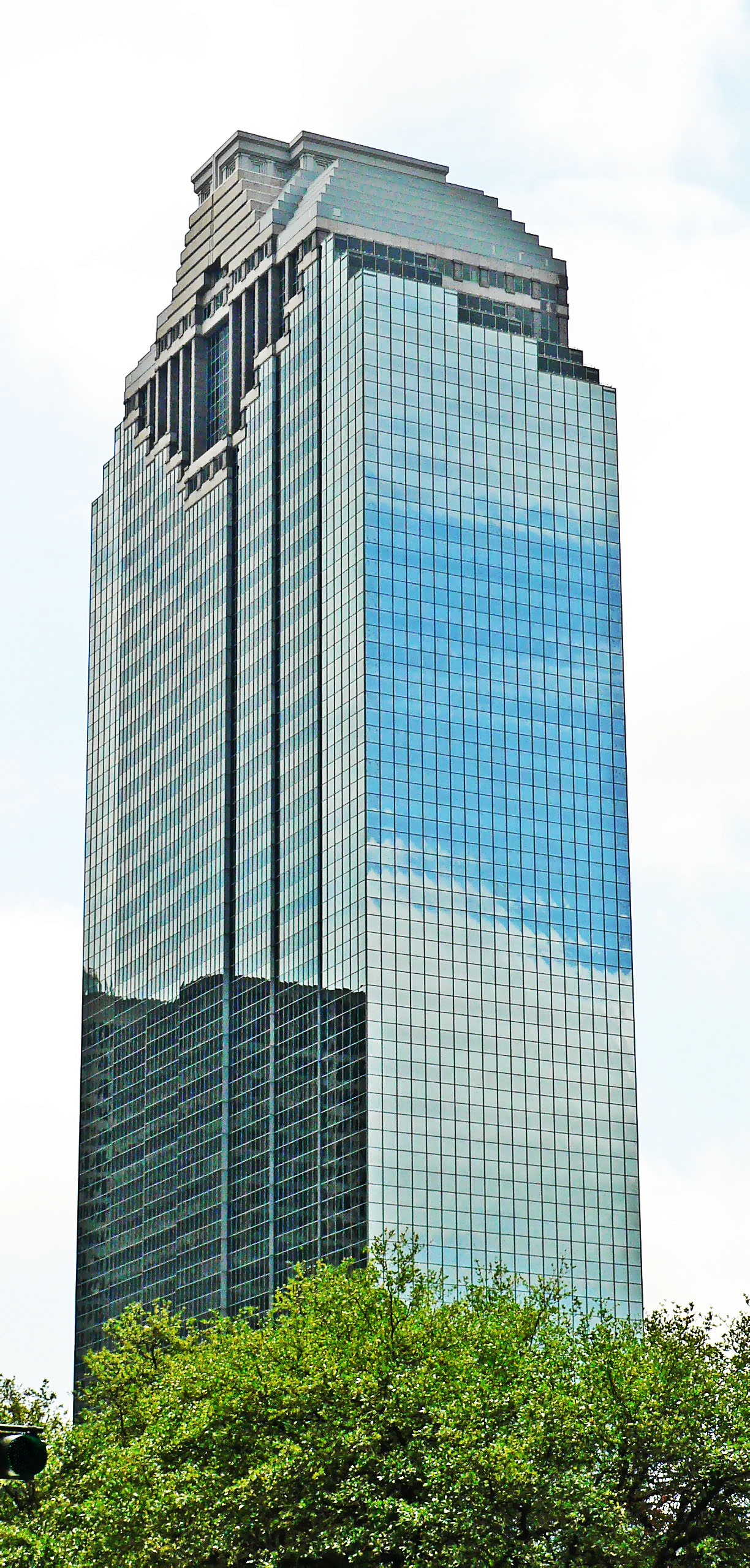
8. Heritage Plaza
Houston

== See also ==
- Architecture of Houston
- Architecture of San Antonio
