= Houston tunnel system =

System of pedestrian tunnels in Houston, US

Coordinates: 29.75°N 95.37°W

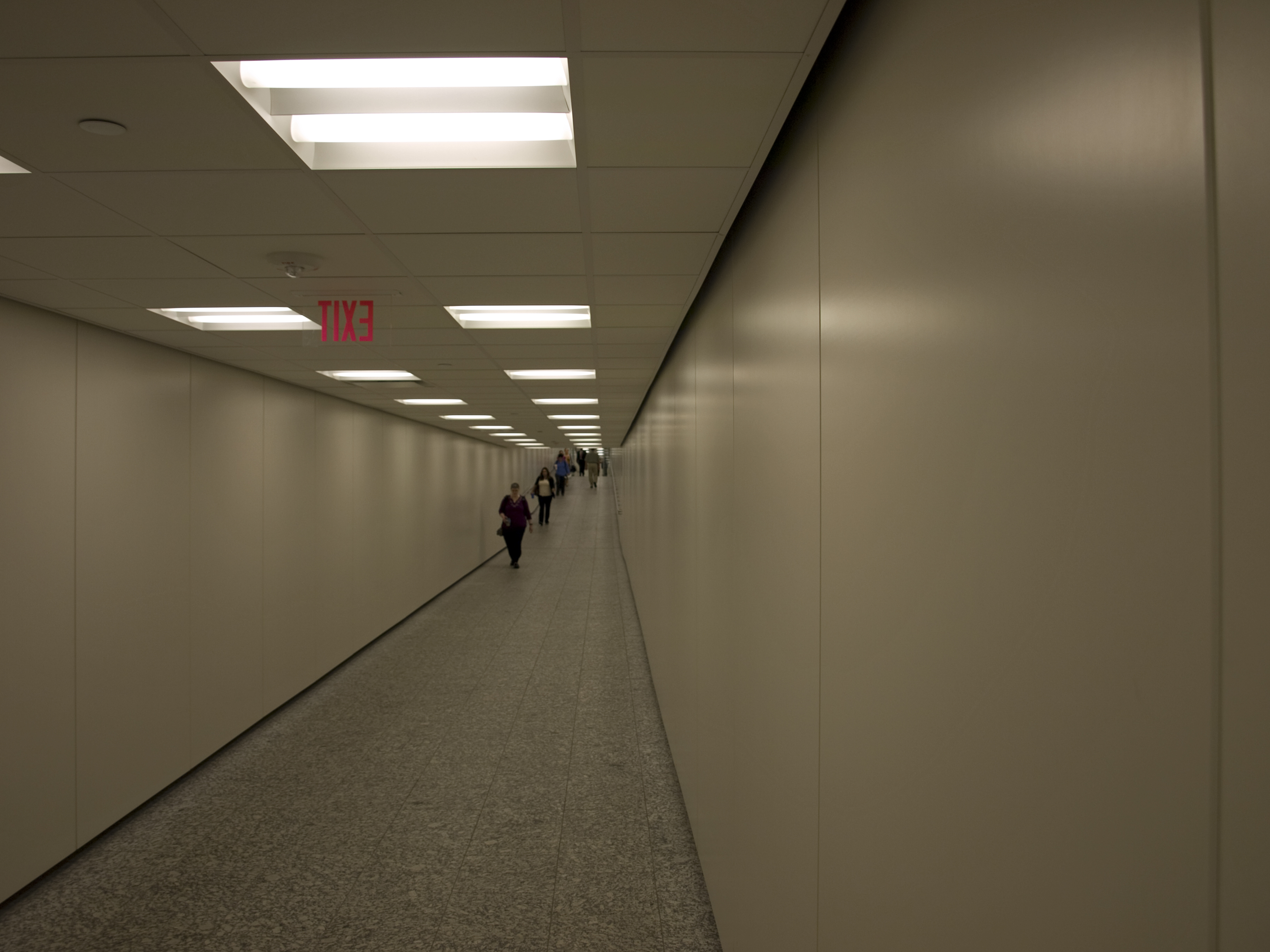
A tunnel in the west part of the downtown loop

The Houston tunnel system is a network of subterranean, climate-controlled, pedestrian walkways that links 95 full city blocks 20 feet (6 m) below Houston's downtown streets. It is approximately six miles (9.7 km) long. There are similar systems in Chicago, Dallas, Oklahoma City, Montreal, and Toronto. Architectural historian Stephen Fox has stated that the idea for the tunnel system came when the Bank of the Southwest Building was "linked by tunnel to the 1010 Garage and the Mellie Esperson Building" in 1961.

== Description ==
The Tunnel is a series of underground passageways that, with above-ground skywalks, link office towers to hotels, banks, corporate and government offices, restaurants, retail stores, and the Houston Theater District. Portions of the tunnel contain gift shops, newsstands, banks, technology centers, flower shops, copy centers, dry cleaners, and food courts similar to a major shopping mall. They are widely and heavily used by office workers and tourists. Only two buildings, Wells Fargo Plaza and McKinney Garage on Main, offer direct access from the street to the Tunnel; other entry points are from street-level stairs, escalators, and elevators inside buildings that are connected to the tunnel. Access is allowed to the general public into these buildings with few restrictions, during normal operating hours, in order to reach the Tunnel.

Most of the retail areas of the Tunnel are in the basements of these buildings, connected by passageways. While walking through, one can determine which building one is in by the unique signage and/or architectural design of that building, as well as the wayfinding system and Houston Tunnel maps. Most of the Tunnel is in the western half of downtown Houston. The tunnel is generally open during weekday business hours only.

The Tunnel has been criticized for its numerous stairways, especially in the northern portion, which make wheelchair use impractical in some locations. Bob Eury, director of the Houston Downtown District, stated that "these areas haven't been made ADA-compliant because it would be difficult or impossible to put in ramps and still leave enough headroom for pedestrians."

== Discontinuous portions ==
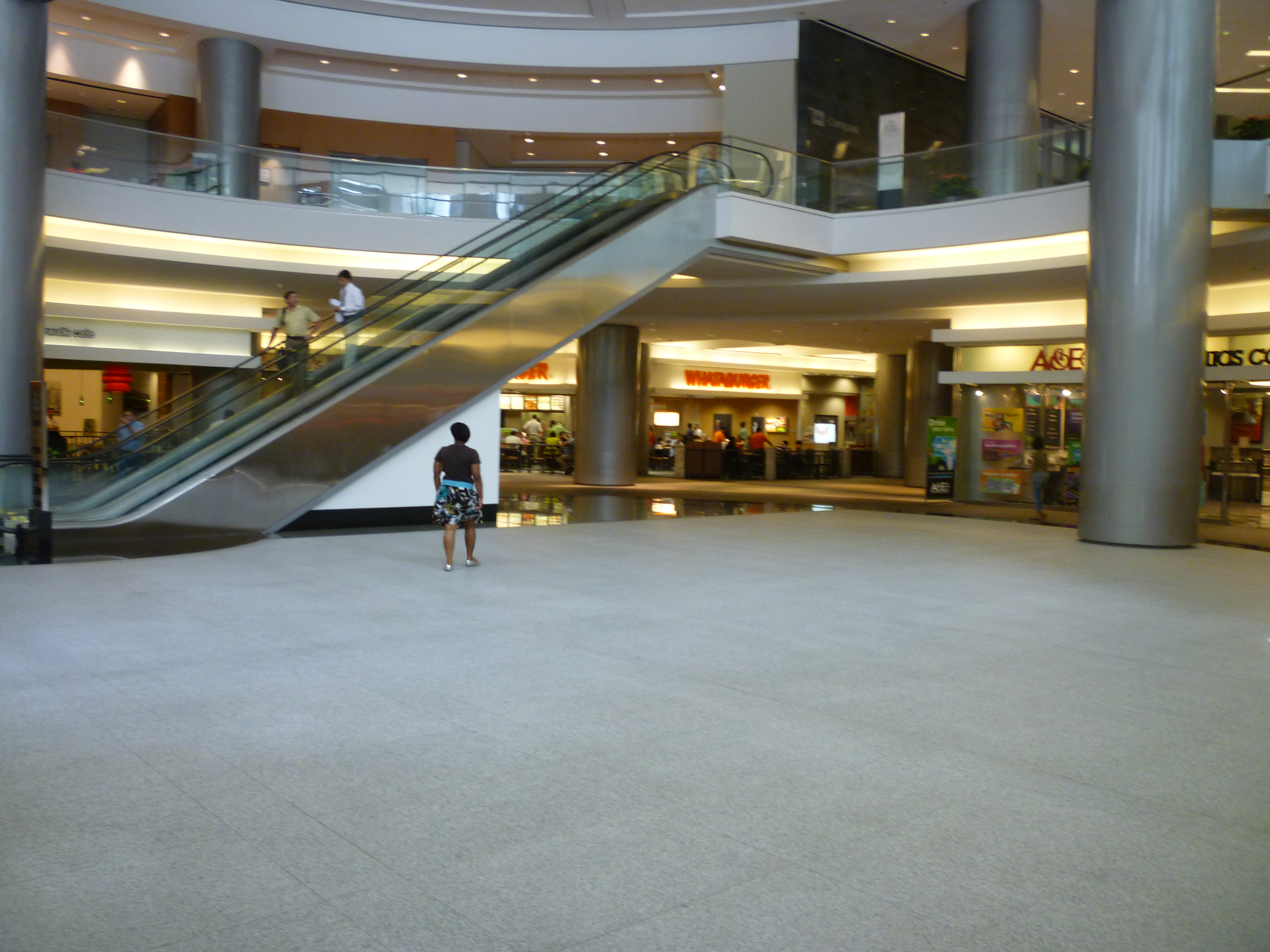
One of several open-air sections of the tunnels

The Harris County tunnel at the far north side of downtown is not connected to the rest of the system by either tunnels or skywalks. It connects Harris County courts, jails, and associated buildings totaling 10 blocks. Six blocks of the St. Joseph Medical Center are connected via skywalks at the southeast corner of downtown near the Pierce elevated.

The Houston Chronicle complex, at 801 Texas Avenue, was connected to the Tunnel until those buildings were imploded in 2017; the newspaper's operations relocated to the former Houston Post complex (off the Southwest Freeway) in 2014.

Other parts not connected to the main Tunnel are the skywalk connections between the Hilton-Americas Hotel and George R. Brown Convention Center, the skywalk connections at the Toyota Center, and at the Houston Public Library.

== Buildings connected ==
This is a partial listing.

- 1001 McKinney
- 1600 Smith
- 1400 Smith
- 1100 Louisiana
- 1111 Travis
- 1500 Louisiana
- Esperson - 808 Travis/815 Walker
- Commerce Towers
- Calpine Center
- JPMorgan Chase Tower
- TC Energy Center
- Pennzoil Place
- One Shell Plaza
- The Esperson buildings
- Wells Fargo Bank Plaza
- Centerpoint Energy Plaza
- Kinder Morgan Building
- Total Plaza
- One Houston Center
- First City Tower
- One Allen Center
- Wedge International Tower
- BG Group Place
- 1111 Fannin
- Hobby Center
- City Hall
- 611 Walker

== Flooding ==
The tunnels, being underground, are prone to flooding. They serve as channels for floodwater, allowing it to move through the tunnels from flooded buildings to unflooded buildings, flooding buildings that would not have been flooded otherwise. After Tropical Storm Allison, some of the buildings installed floodgates to prevent another occurrence of tunnel flooding.
