= Waterline (Austin) =

Skyscraper in Austin, Texas, U.S.

Waterline Tower

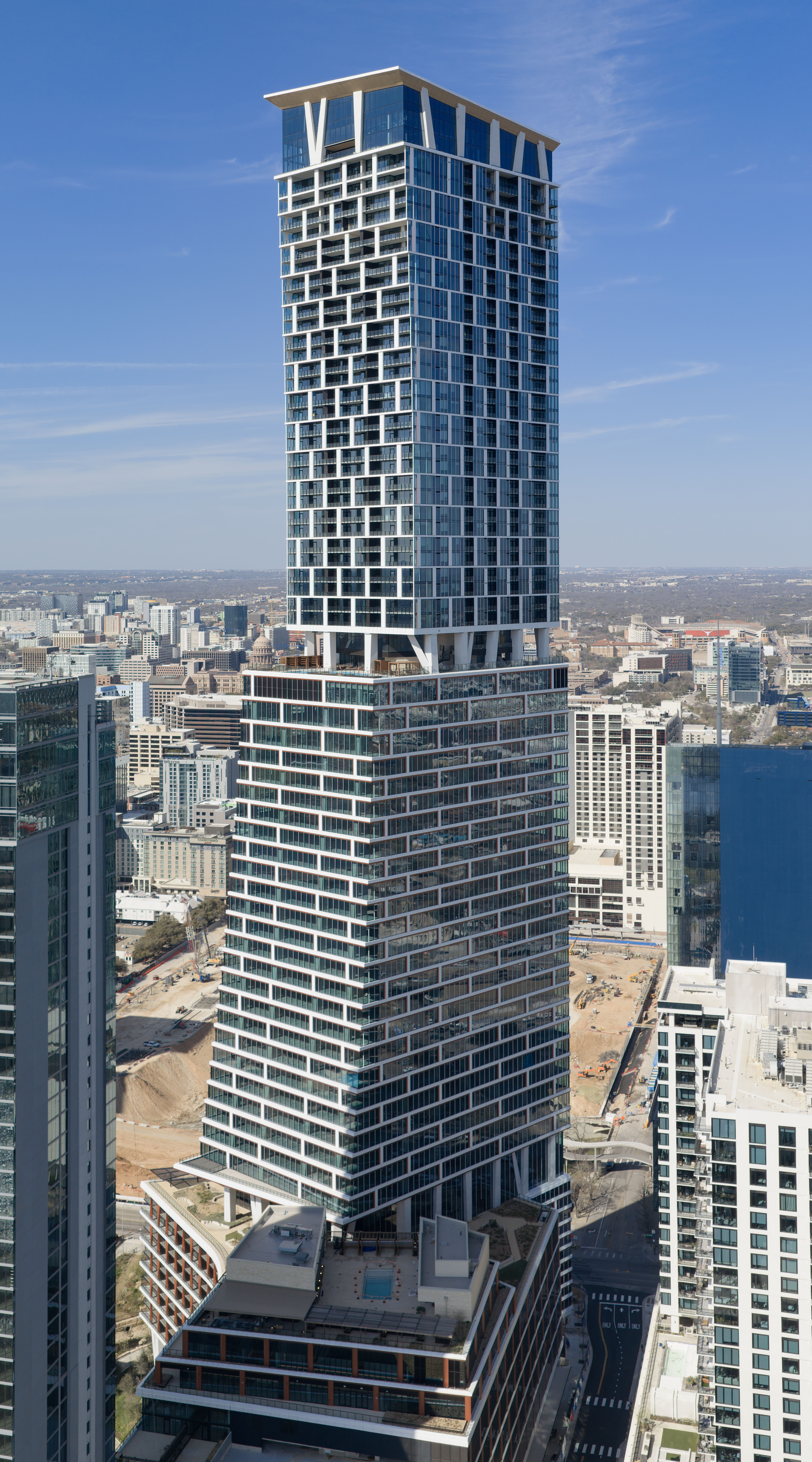
- Waterline in March 2026

General information
- Status: Completed
- Location: 98 Red River, Austin, Texas, US
- Coordinates: 30.261563°N 97.739145°W
- Construction started: 2022
- Opening: 2026
- Cost: $520 million

Height
- Roof: 1,034 ft (315 m)

Technical details
- Floor count: 74

Design and construction
- Architect: Kohn Pedersen Fox
- Developer: Lincoln Property Company, Kairoi Residential
- Structural engineer: Brockette/Davis/Drake, Inc.
- Main contractor: DPR Construction

Website
- waterlineaustin.com

Waterline is a skyscraper in Austin, Texas, United States. At 1,034 feet (315 m) tall, it is a mixed-use building with residential, office, and hotel space. Upon topping out in August 2025, it became the tallest building in Austin and the tallest building in Texas as well as the tallest building in the Southern United States. Construction was completed in late August, 2026.

== Tenants ==
Occupants of Waterline Austin include 1 Hotel Austin, a 252-room hotel operated by Starwood Hotels, and Alteño, a restaurant concept by the founders of the Denver-based and Michelin starred restaurant, Alma Fonda Fina. Alteño serves Altos de Jalisco inspired Mexican food and opened Summer 2026.

== Location ==
Waterline is bordered, on the east, by the Rainey Street Historic District and on the west by Waller Creek. North of the building is Cesar Chavez Street and a few blocks south of Waterline is Lady Bird Lake.

== Gallery ==
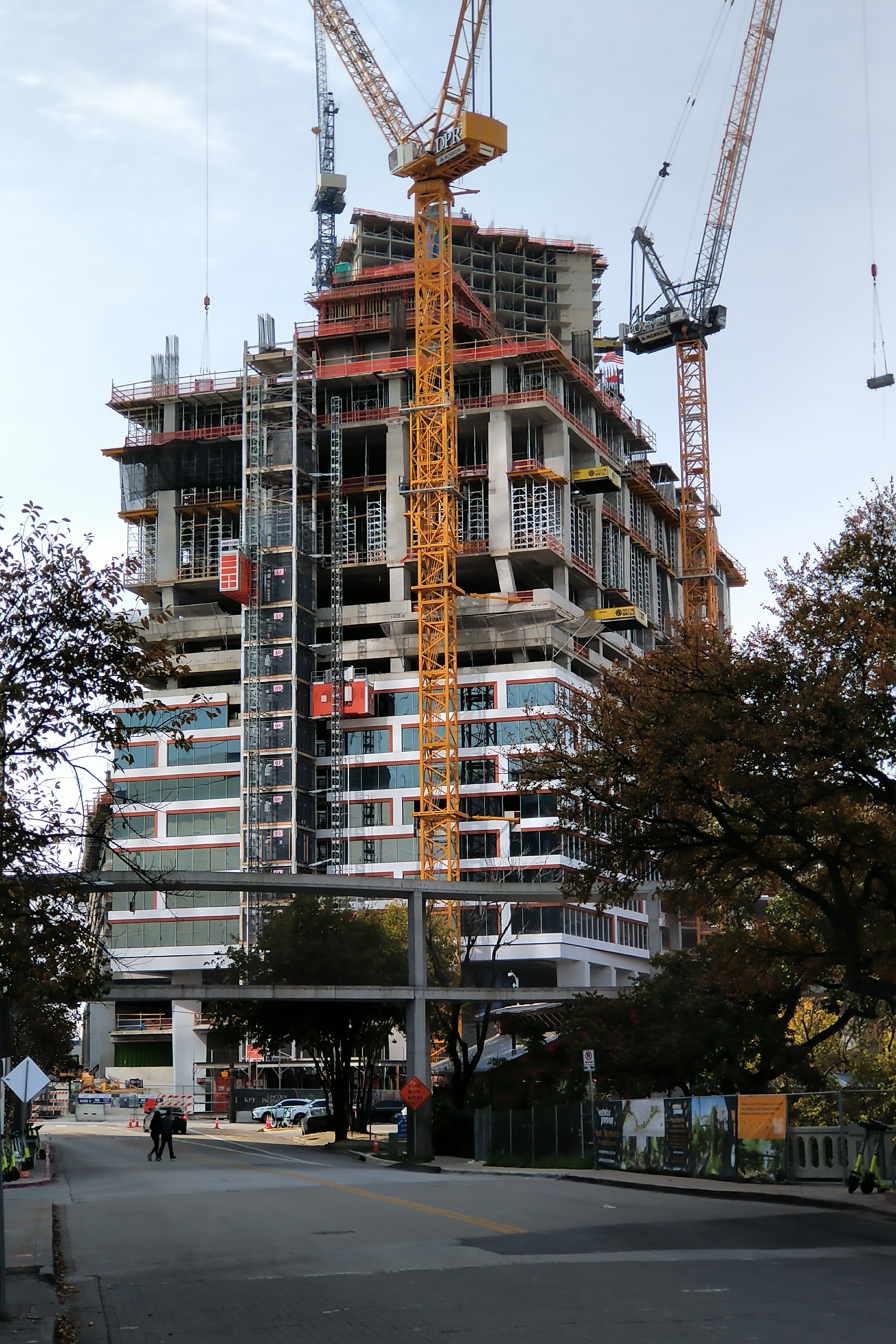
The tower under construction in December 2023

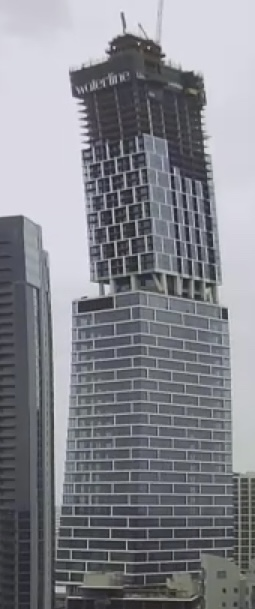
Status as of April 27 2025

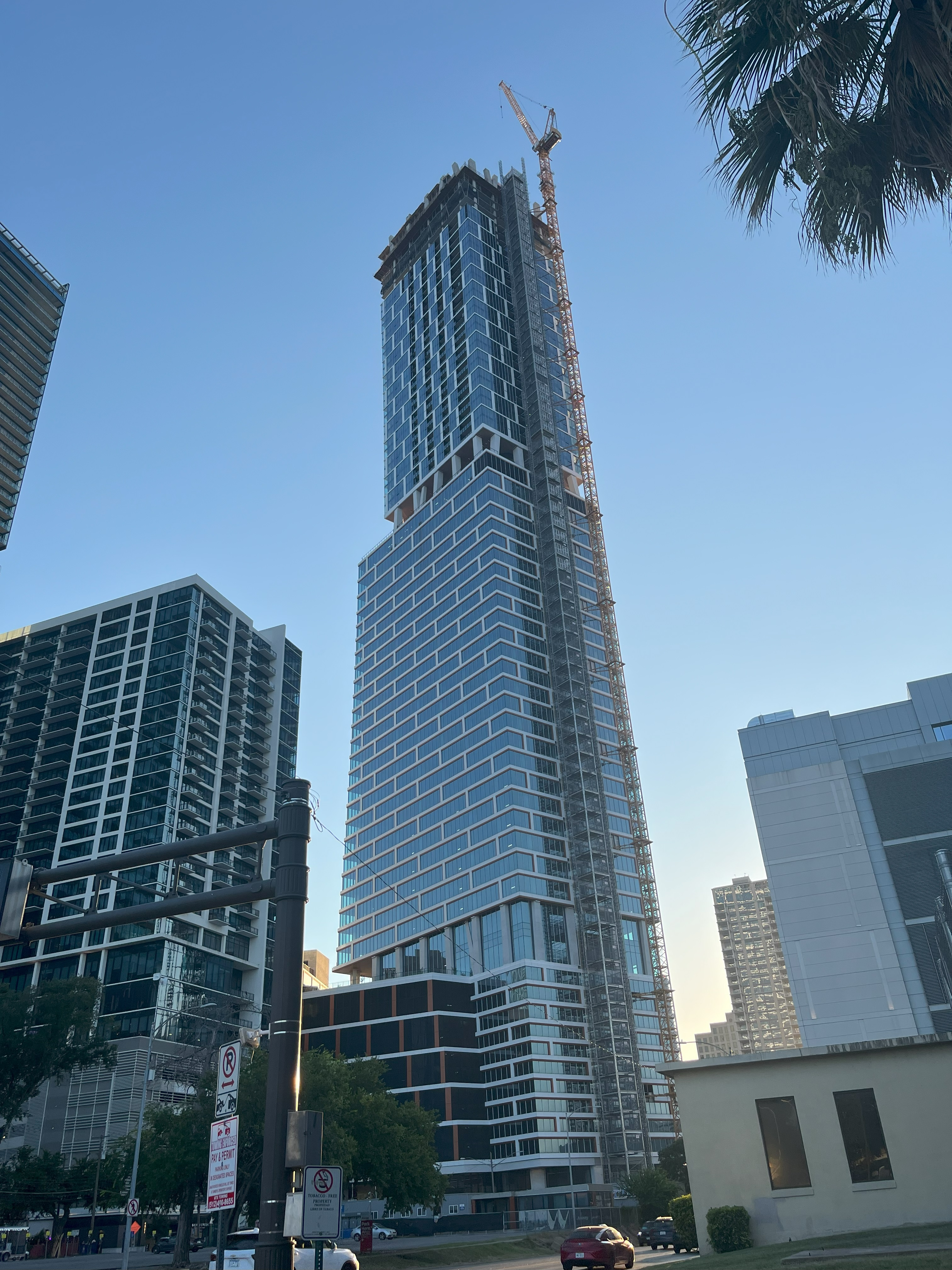
Status as of August 3 2025

== See also ==
- List of tallest buildings in Austin
- List of tallest buildings in Texas
