= List of tallest buildings in Texas =

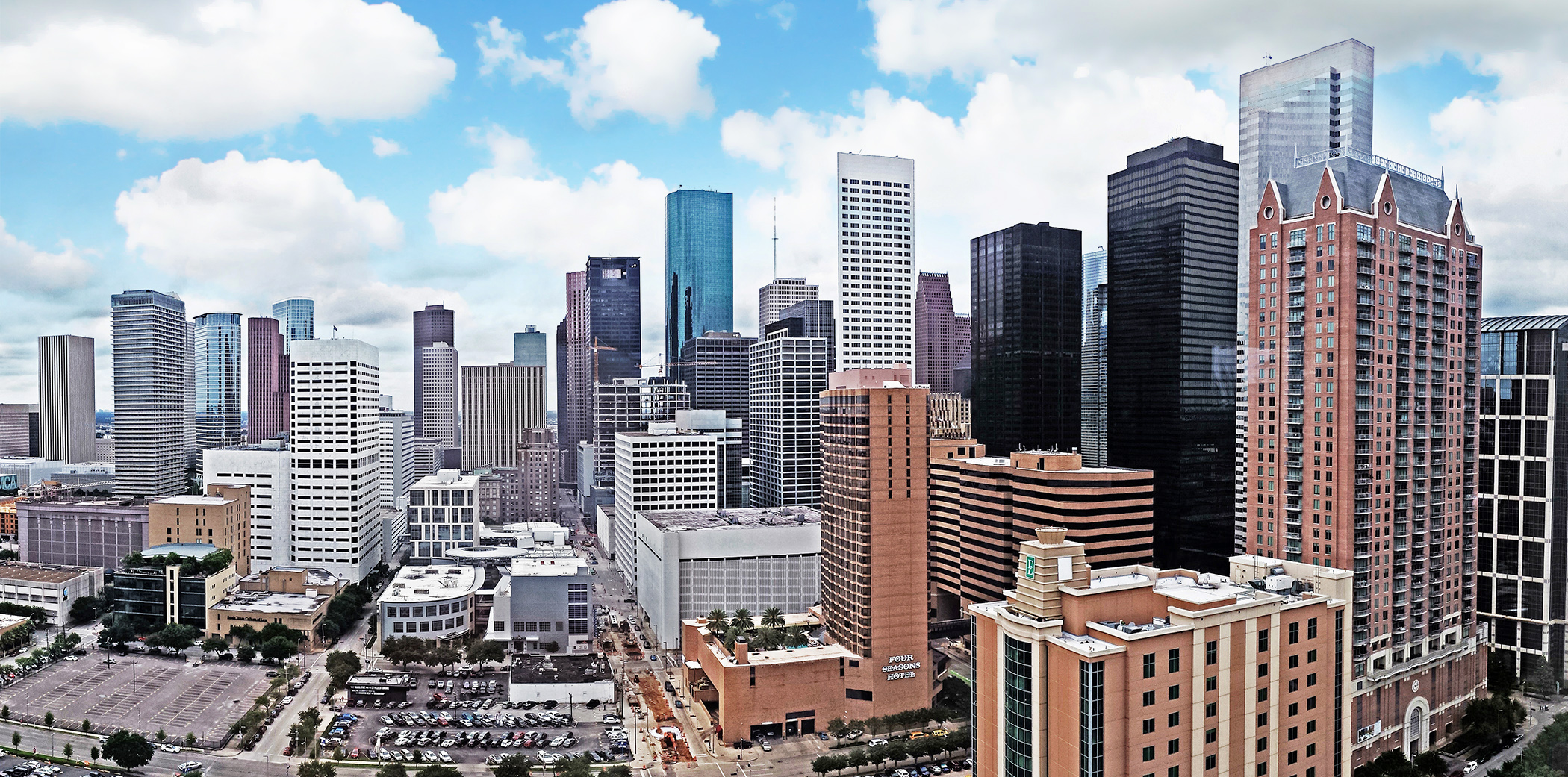
The downtown skyline of Houston

This list of tallest buildings in Texas ranks skyscrapers in the U.S. state of Texas by height. The tallest structure in the state, excluding radio towers, is the Waterline, in Austin, which contains 74 floors and is 1,025 ft (312 m) tall. The second-tallest building in the state is the JP Morgan Chase Tower in Houston, which rises 1,002 feet (305 m) above the ground. As of May 2011, there are 1,217 completed high-rises in the state.

Texas's history of skyscrapers began with the completion in 1909 of the 14-story Praetorian Building in Dallas, which is considered to be the state's first high-rise. The building rose 190 feet (58 m) above ground.

== Tallest buildings ==
This list ranks Texas skyscrapers that stand at least 600 feet (183 m) tall, based on standard height measurement. This includes spires and architectural details but does not include antenna masts or other objects not part of the original plans (with the exception of the broadcast array that was added to the top of Renaissance Tower twelve years after its initial completion). Existing structures are included for ranking purposes based on present height.

Was the tallest building in Texas upon completion

Rank	Building	Image	City	Height ft (m)	Floors	Year	Notes
1	Waterline	Waterline 8-3-25	Austin	1,025 feet (312 m)	74	2026	Tallest building in Austin and Texas.
2	JPMorgan Chase Tower		Houston	1,002 feet (305 m)	75	1982	Tallest building in Houston. 26th tallest building in the United States. Tallest pentagonal building in the world.
3	Wells Fargo Plaza		Houston	992 feet (302 m)	72	1983	34th tallest building in the United States.
4	Bank of America (Dallas)		Dallas	921 feet (281 m)	72	1985	Tallest building in Dallas. 40th tallest building in the United States.
5	Williams Tower		Houston	901 feet (275 m)	64	1983	46th tallest building in the United States. Tallest building in Houston outside of downtown. Tallest building in U.S. not located in a CBD.
6	Renaissance Tower		Dallas	886 feet (270 m)	56	1974	53rd tallest building in the United States.
7	Sixth and Guadalupe		Austin	875 feet (267 m)	66	2023	55th tallest building in the United States.
8	Comerica Bank Tower		Dallas	787 feet (240 m)	60	1987	85th tallest building in the United States.
9	TC Energy Center		Houston	780 feet (238 m)	56	1983	90th tallest building in the United States.
10	Heritage Plaza		Houston	762 feet (232 m)	53	1987	103rd tallest building in the United States.
11	Enterprise Plaza		Houston	756 feet (230 m)	55	1980	106th tallest building in the United States, tied with 609 Main at Texas.
12	609 Main at Texas		Houston	755 feet (230 m)	48	2017	106th tallest building in the United States, tied with Enterprise Plaza.
13	Centerpoint Energy Plaza		Houston	741 feet (226 m)	47	1974	127th tallest building in the United States.
14	JPMorgan Chase Tower		Dallas	738 feet (225 m)	55	1987	132nd tallest building in the United States.
15	Texas Tower		Houston	735 feet (224 m)	48	2021	
16	Continental Center I		Houston	732 feet (223 m)	53	1984	137th tallest building in the United States.
17	Fulbright Tower		Houston	725 feet (221 m)	52	1982	145th tallest building in the United States.
18	Fountain Place		Dallas	720 feet (219 m)	62	1986	152nd tallest building in the United States.
19	One Shell Plaza		Houston	714 feet (218 m)	50	1971	Tallest building in Texas until 1974. 156th tallest building in the United States.
20	The Republic		Austin	710 feet (216 m)	46	2025	
21	1400 Smith Street		Houston	691 feet (211 m)	50	1983	
22	The Independent		Austin	690 feet (210 m)	58	2019	The tallest all-residential building in the United States west of the Mississippi River.
23	Trammell Crow Center		Dallas	686 feet (209 m)	50	1985	
24	Three Allen Center		Houston	685 feet (209 m)	50	1980	
25	The Austonian		Austin	683 feet (208 m)	56	2010	
26	1 Houston Center		Houston	678 feet (207 m)	48	1978	
27	ATX Tower		Austin	675 feet (206 m)	58	2025	
28	First City Tower		Houston	662 feet (202 m)	49	1981	
29	Modern Austin		Austin	655 feet (200 m)	55	2025	
30	1700 Pacific		Dallas	660 feet (201 m)	50	1983	
31	Santander Tower		Dallas	645 feet (197 m)	50	1982	
32	415 Colorado		Austin	634 feet (193 m)	50	2025	
30	811 Main		Houston	630 feet (192 m)	46	2011	
31	Energy Plaza		Dallas	629 feet (192 m)	49	1983	
32	The National		Dallas	625 feet (191 m)	52	1965	Tallest building west of the Mississippi River until 1969. Tallest building in Texas until 1971.
32	San Felipe Plaza		Houston	625 feet (191 m)	45	1984	
34	ExxonMobil Building		Houston	607 feet (185 m)	44	1963	
35	Gables Republic Tower		Dallas	602 feet (183 m)	36	1954	

== Timeline of tallest buildings ==
Name	Height	Years as tallest	City
Adolphus Hotel	312 ft (95 m)	1912－1923	Dallas
Magnolia Hotel	399 ft (122 m)	1923－1927	Dallas
Niels Esperson Building	410 ft (120 m)	1927－1929	Houston
Gulf Building	428 ft (130 m)	1929－1943	Houston
Mercantile National Bank Building	523 ft (159 m)	1943－1954	Dallas
Republic Bank Building	602 ft (183 m)	1954－1963	Dallas
ExxonMobil Building	606 ft (185 m)	1963－1965	Houston
First National Bank Tower	627 ft (191 m)	1965－1971	Dallas
One Shell Plaza	715 ft (218 m)	1971－1980	Houston
Enterprise Plaza	756 ft (230 m)	1980－1982	Houston
JPMorgan Chase Tower	1,002 ft (305 m)	1982－2026	Houston
Waterline	1,025 ft (312 m)	2026－present	Austin

== See also ==
- List of tallest buildings in Houston
- List of tallest buildings in Dallas
- List of tallest buildings in Austin
- List of tallest buildings in San Antonio
- List of tallest buildings in Fort Worth
- List of tallest buildings in El Paso
- List of tallest buildings in the United States
- Architecture of Texas
