= Enterprise Plaza =

Skyscraper in Houston, Texas

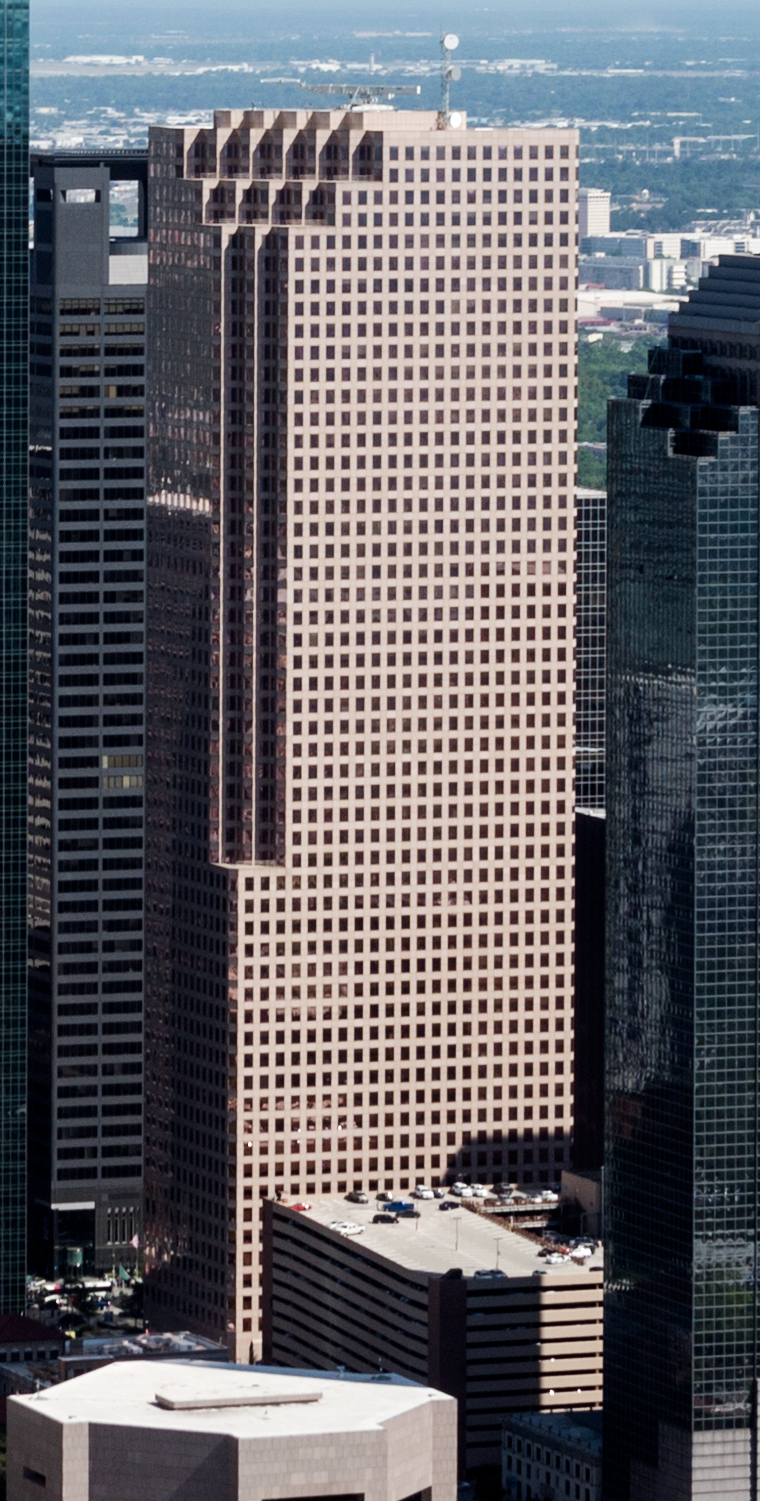
- Enterprise Plaza in 2014
- Interactive map of the Enterprise Plaza area
- Alternative names: 1100 Louisiana; First International Plaza; Interfirst Plaza; Southwest Bank of Texas

General information
- Status: Completed
- Type: Commercial offices
- Location: 1100 Louisiana; Houston, Texas
- Coordinates: 29.75768°N 95.36906°W
- Completed: 1980
- Owner: Fantome Tower
- Operator: Hines Interests Limited Partnership

Height
- Roof: 230 m (750 ft)

Technical details
- Floor count: 55
- Floor area: 135,500 m^{2} (1,459,000 sq ft)
- Lifts/elevators: 27

Design and construction
- Architect: Skidmore, Owings & Merrill
- Developer: Hines Interests Limited Partnership

Enterprise Plaza (also known as 1100 Louisiana) is a 55-story, 230 m (750 ft) skyscraper at 1100 Louisiana Street in downtown Houston, Texas The headquarters of Enterprise Products is located in the Enterprise Plaza.

Enterprise Plaza was completed in 1980 by Hines. It was sold in 1985 to Capitol Guidance Corporation which sold it again to National Office Partners Limited Partnership (NOP), a joint venture between Hines Interests Limited Partnership and the California Public Employees Retirement System (CalPERS). Hines Real Estate bought the tower in January 2000.

Enterprise Plaza is an office building located in the heart of Houston's energy and financial corridor. It stands at 756 ft (230 m) tall with 55 stories. It was the tallest building in Texas from 1980 until 1982 when it was surpassed by the JPMorgan Chase Tower.

== Major tenants ==
- Enterprise Products
- King & Spalding
- Ryder Scott
- Gibbs & Bruns
- Page

== See also ==
- List of tallest buildings in Houston
- List of tallest buildings in Texas
- List of tallest buildings in the United States
