= Esperson Buildings =

Niels and Mellie Esperson Buildings
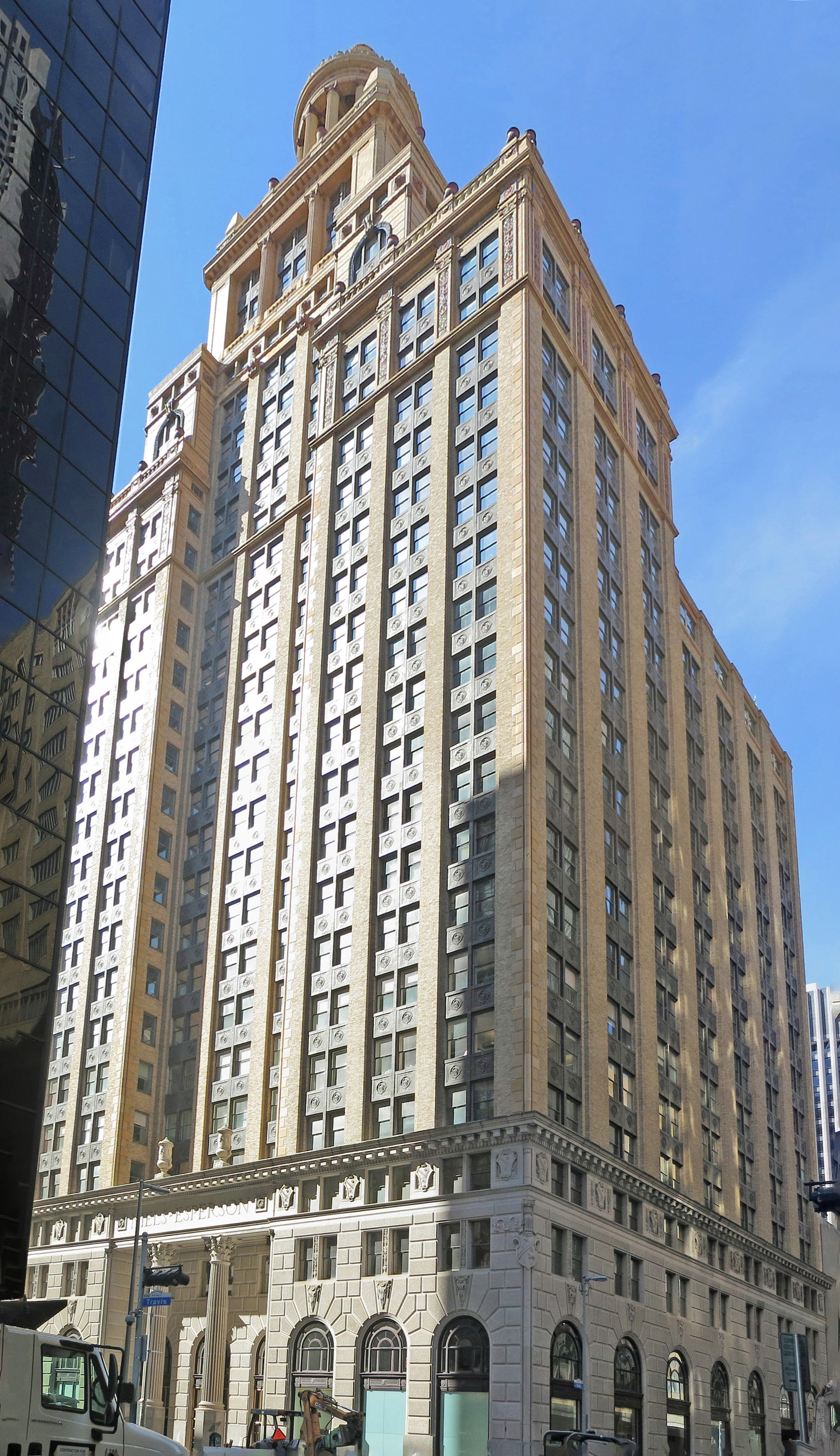
- The Niels Esperson Building
- Interactive map of the Niels and Mellie Esperson Buildings area

General information
- Status: Completed
- Type: Commercial offices
- Architectural style: Neoclassical; Art Deco/Art Moderne
- Location: Travis and Walker Streets; Houston, Texas
- Coordinates: 29.7590°N 95.3653°W
- Completed: Niels tower: 1927; Mellie tower: 1939–1941

Height
- Roof: Niels tower: 125 m (410 ft); Mellie tower: 82.9 m (272 ft)

Technical details
- Floor count: Niels tower: 32; Mellie tower: 19
- Floor area: 570,044 ft^{2} (52,958.8 m^{2})

Design and construction
- Architect: John Eberson

The Niels and Mellie Esperson Buildings are a building complex in downtown Houston, Texas. Mary Ann Azevedo of the Houston Business Journal said that they were "among the most recognizable" buildings in Downtown.

The Niels Esperson Building is the only complete example of Italian Renaissance architecture in Downtown Houston. Designed by theater architect John Eberson, the Esperson buildings were built in 1927 and 1941, respectively. They are elaborately detailed with massive columns, great urns, terraces, and a grand tempietto at the top, similar to one built in the courtyard of San Pietro in Rome in 1502.

Mellie Esperson had the first of the two buildings constructed for her husband, Niels, a real estate and oil tycoon. His name is carved on the side of the building, above the entrance, in large letters. The name "Mellie Esperson" is carved on the accompanying structure, known as the Mellie Esperson building, although that structure is only a nineteen-story annex to the original Esperson building; thus is the newer of both buildings and it is not as tall. Also, instead of it being of neo-classical design, it was constructed in Art-Deco style.

Sherry Thomas of USA Today said that rumors of the buildings being haunted existed. The ghost of Mellie Esperson is said to have haunted the building. In 2007 Cameron Management Inc. sold the Esperson buildings to Seligman Western Enterprises Ltd.

== Popular culture ==
- The movie Reality Bites had scenes filmed showing the top of the Niels Esperson tower.
- The Bollywood film Sirf Tum had scenes filmed at the top of the Niels Esperson tower, notably for the song "Dilbar (Beloved)".

== Gallery ==
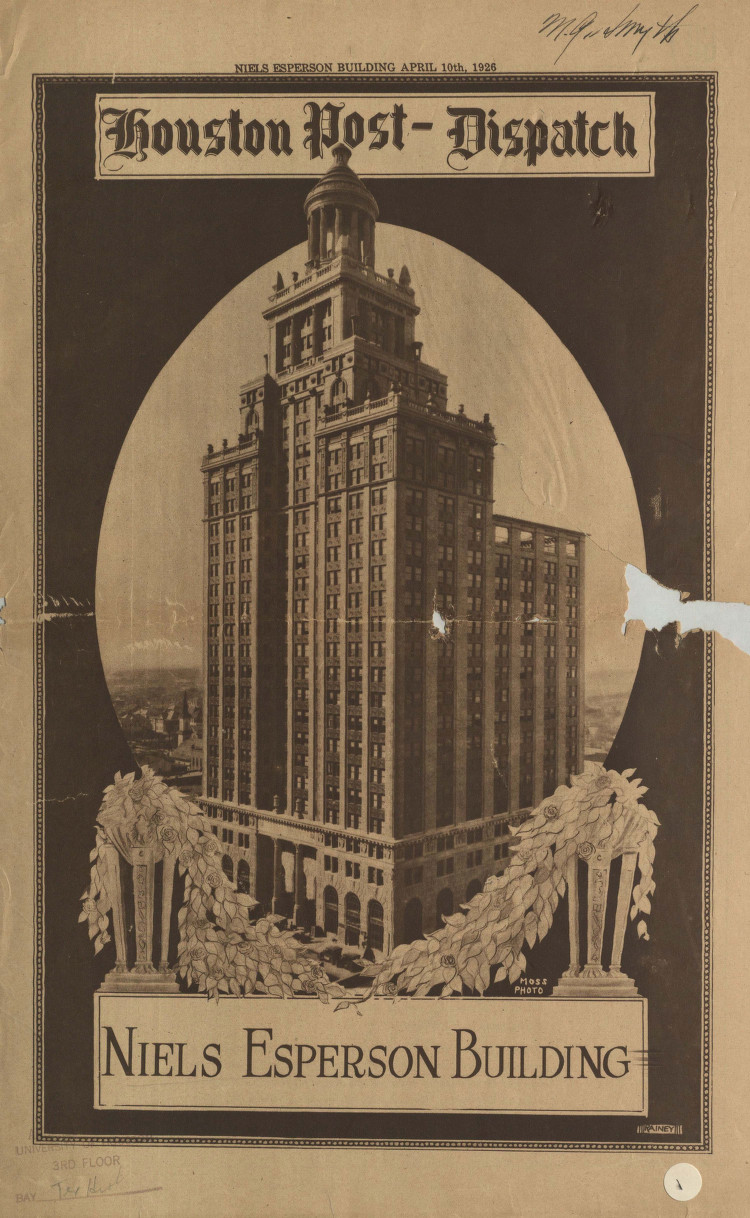
Pamphlet of Neils Esperson Building, 1926

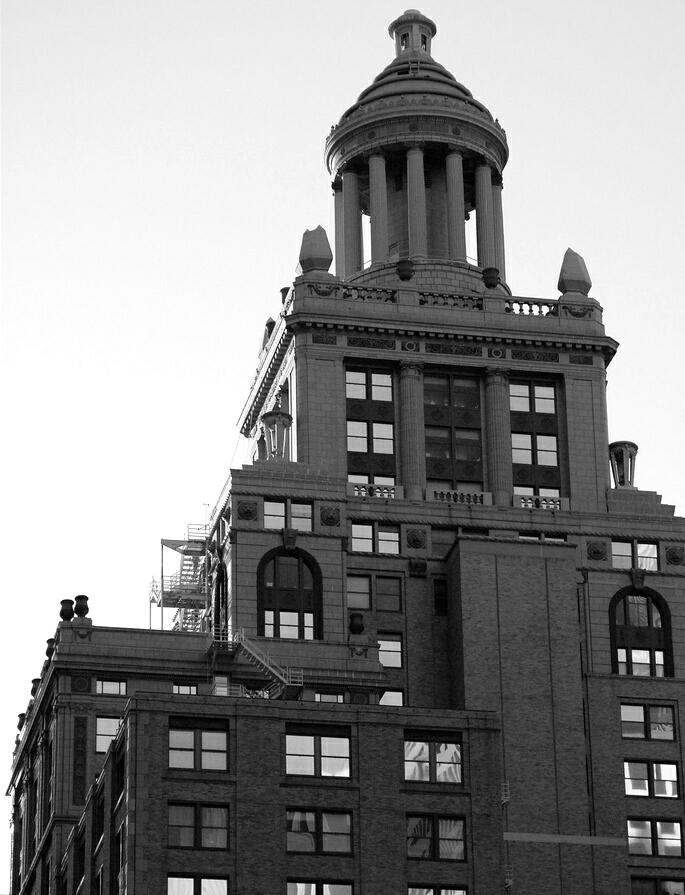
The tempietto of the Niels Esperson Building

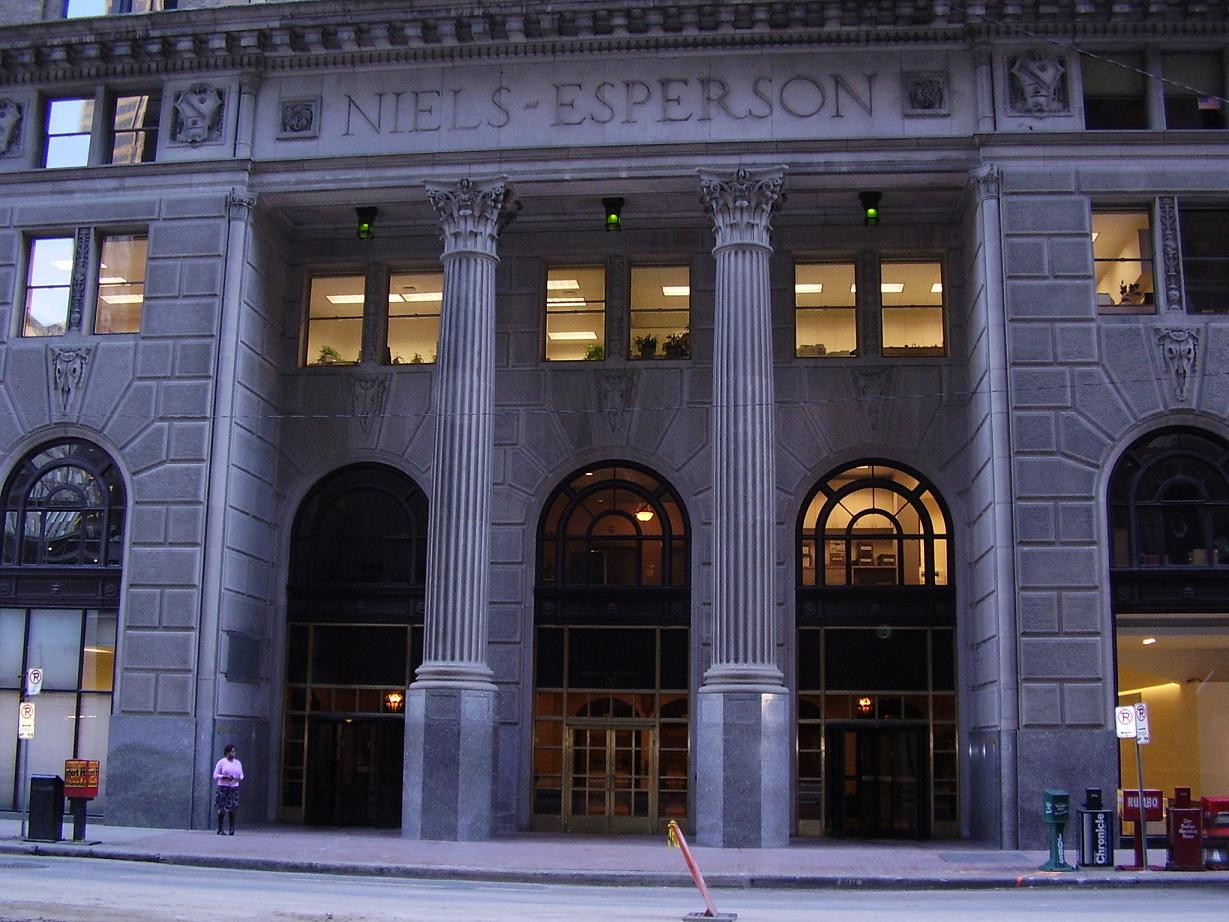
The entrance to the Niels Esperson Building

== See also ==
- List of tallest buildings in Houston
- List of tallest buildings in Texas
- List of tallest buildings in the United States
