= First City Tower =

Skyscraper in Houston, Texas

1001 Fannin
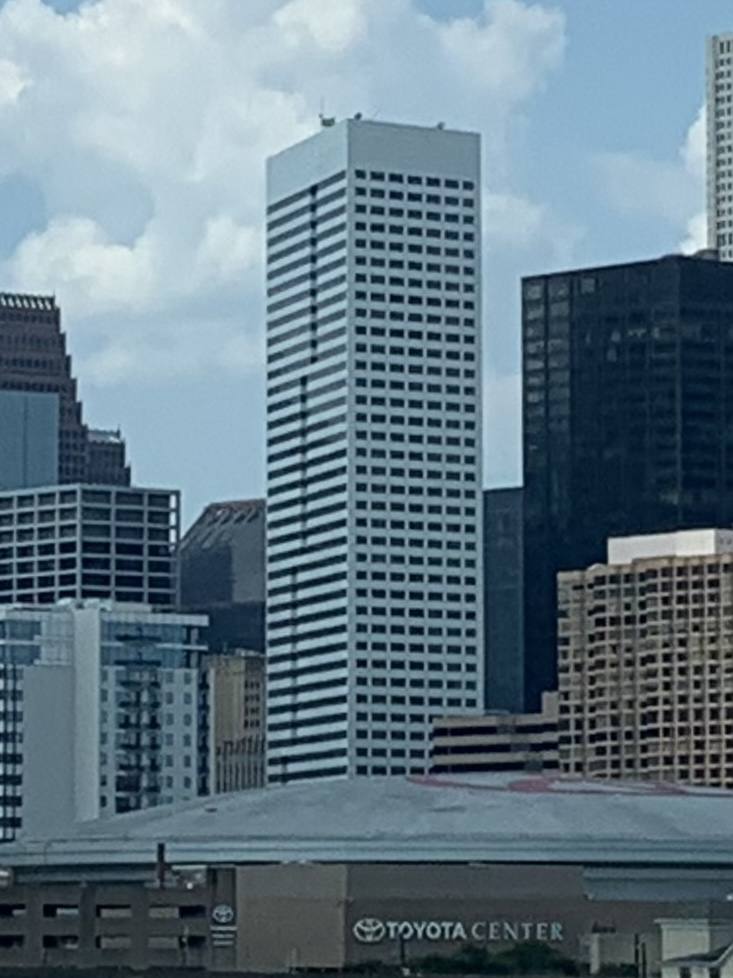
- Interactive map of the 1001 Fannin area

General information
- Status: Completed
- Type: Office
- Location: 1001 Fannin Street, Houston, Texas
- Coordinates: 29.75579°N 95.36384°W
- Completed: 1981
- Owner: First City Liquidating Trust, JMB Realty

Height
- Roof: 662 ft (202 m)

Technical details
- Floor count: 49
- Floor area: 1,428,365 ft^{2} (132,699.5 m^{2})

Design and construction
- Architect: Morris Architects (formerly Morris-Aubry)
- Developer: Vinson & Elkins
- Main contractor: W. S. Bellows Construction Corporation

1001 Fannin (Formerly known as First City Tower), located at 1001 Fannin, is a skyscraper in downtown Houston, Texas. The building rises 662 feet (202 m) in height. Completed in 1981, it contains 49 floors. First City Tower currently stands as the 14th-tallest building in the city. The architectural firm who designed the building was Morris-Aubry, and was built by W. S. Bellows Construction Corporation. The structure is an example of late-modernist architecture. The tower, which formerly housed the headquarters of the now-defunct First City National Bank, former global headquarters of Waste Management, Inc, and the previous headquarters of Vinson & Elkins. Currently, it serves as the global headquarters for its primary tenant, Chord Energy. It also houses the U.S. headquarters of Campus Living Villages.

The building, with Class A office space, has 1,278,867 square feet (118,810.6 m^{2}) of office space. The building is noted for its distinctive "notches" on the north and south facades, and is composed mostly of aluminum and green-tinted glass. These designs were designed to represent the letter "F" for the building's developer and first major tenant, First City Bank, which was itself founded by attorneys of the international law firm Vinson & Elkins. First City Tower was constructed in a diagonal rotation away from Houston's main north–south street grid, which gives the impression that the structure has a larger footprint than it actually does.

== History ==
Morris Architects designed First City Tower, which opened in 1981. JMB Realty owned one third of First City Tower since the late 1980s.

In 2002, Waste Management, Inc., and Vinson & Elkins, and Ocean Energy Inc. were the major tenants and Insignia/ESG, the managing agent, was also a tenant. In October 2002, the building became the first in Houston to implement an in-house courier intercept center in order to provide a central collection point for all inbound and outbound deliveries serving its several tenants.

In 2003, JMB Realty bought the First City Tower and a 10-story parking garage, which houses the Houston Club, for an amount reported by the Houston Business Journal as $114 million. As of 2003, the largest tenant was Vinson & Elkins, which by that year had renewed its lease until 2020.

By 2004, Ocean Energy, after being acquired by Devon Energy, vacated 250,000 square feet (23,000 m^{2}) of space in the First City Tower. In the same year, renovations to the tower began. FC Tower Property Partners, the owner and a limited partnership operated by an affiliate of JMB Realty, selected Morris Architects to design the public spaces in the tower. CB Richard Ellis, the property manager, oversaw the construction management. Granite pavers and landscaped planters were placed in the north and south plazas. The entrance columns were re-clad in stainless steel. A limestone monument, displaying the address and tenants of the First City Tower, was erected at the intersection of Fannin and Lamar. A private garden, used by tenants to host performances and receptions, was added.

In November 2010, SSY Chemicals leased space in the building.

By January 2011, Black Stone Minerals renewed its lease for its headquarters in the First City Tower and expanded its space by 13,119 square feet (1,218.8 m^{2}), giving it a total of 55,082 square feet (5,117.3 m^{2}).

In 2019, the property underwent an extensive renovation that include the exterior plazas, lobby, adding a fitness center, and replaced the original escalators.

As of 2026, the largest tenant is Chord Energy, which is a conglomeration of prior tenant Oasis Energy and Whitting Petroleum (Denver).

== See also ==
- List of tallest buildings in Texas
- Architecture of Houston
