= Wells Fargo Plaza (Houston) =

Skyscraper in Houston, Texas

1000 Louisiana

- The Wells Fargo Plaza (center) in 2014

General information
- Status: Completed
- Type: Office
- Location: 1000 Louisiana Street; Houston, Texas, United States
- Coordinates: 29.7584396°N 95.3682630°W
- Completed: 1982; 44 years ago
- Opening: 1983; 43 years ago
- Owner: MetLife (50%); New York State Common Retirement Fund (50%)

Height
- Roof: 992 ft (302.4 m)

Technical details
- Floor count: 71
- Floor area: 1,833,760 ft^{2} (170,362 m^{2})

Design and construction
- Architects: Richard Keating of Skidmore, Owings & Merrill LLP, also Lloyd Jones Brewer & Associates
- Developer: Century Development Management

Website
- www.1000louisiana.com

1000 Louisiana: Wells Fargo Plaza, formerly the Allied Bank Plaza and First Interstate Bank Plaza, is a skyscraper located at 1000 Louisiana Street in Downtown Houston, Texas, United States.

The building is the second-tallest building in Houston (behind JPMorgan Chase Tower), the third-tallest building in Texas, and the 33rd-tallest building in the United States.

From street level, the building is 992 feet (302.4 meters) tall and contains 71 floors. It extends four more stories below street level. Only the Wells Fargo Plaza offers direct access from the street to the Houston tunnel system (a series of underground walkways connecting many of downtown Houston's office towers); otherwise, entry points are from street-level stairs, escalators, and elevators located inside buildings that are connected to the tunnel.

Wells Fargo Plaza features a wide variety of fine amenities for its tenants including The Houstonian Lite Health Club located on the 14th floor. Sky lobbies on the 34/35th and 58/59th floors are publicly accessible and offer views of Downtown Houston. These sky lobbies are served by double-decker elevators and primarily serve as transfer floors to local elevators.

The entrance of the skyscraper appears in the final scene of 1989 American thriller film Cohen and Tate (also known as "Cohen & Tate").

== History ==
Wells Fargo Plaza's Logo

It was designed by Richard Keating, FAIA, while a partner of Skidmore, Owings & Merrill. In 1983, the building lost a large number of windows during Hurricane Alicia. Originally named the Allied Bank Plaza, it was renamed to the First Interstate Bank Plaza in 1988. First Interstate Bancorp was then taken over in 1996 by Wells Fargo, therefore transferring ownership of the building.

In 1993, the Consulate-General of the United Kingdom in Houston leased 9,707 square feet (901.8 m^{2}) in the First Interstate Plaza. In 1995 Koll Real Estate lost the management contract for the First Interstate Plaza. In 1996, NGC Corp. (now Dynegy) leased 260,000 square feet (24,000 m^{2}) in the First Interstate Plaza. The company moved over 700 jobs from a suburban office building along U.S. Route 290 (Northwest Freeway) to the Wells Fargo Plaza. In 2012, the company moved out of the building as part of downsizing initiatives while undergoing bankruptcy procedures.

In 2006, Targa Resources signed an 11-year lease to occupy 101,600 square feet (9,440 m^{2}) of space in the Wells Fargo Plaza. Targa expanded from its subleased space and began to occupy floors 43 through 46. With the expiration of the lease, Targa has since moved to 811 Louisiana. In 2007, CB Richard Ellis became the exclusive leasing agent for Wells Fargo Plaza. As of October of that year the building was 91% leased. The leased space consists mostly of large tenants, with some mid-sized tenants occupying space.

In December 2014, PwC moved into the offices formerly occupied by Dynegy.

== Tenants ==
The Houston office of PwC is primarily located in Suite 5800.

The Houstonian Lite club is located in a 12,000-square-foot (1,100 m^{2}) area on the 14th floor. It includes group exercise studio space, locker rooms, a private Pilates studio, and exercise equipment. The club, operated by The Redstone Cos., operators of The Houstonian Hotel, was the third "Houstonian Lite" club in Greater Houston, and it was scheduled to open in mid-to-late March 2006. It had been under construction since December 2005. The owner of the Wells Fargo building, Metropolitan Life Insurance Co. and Metropolitan Tower Realty Company Inc., and the building manager and lessor, Lincoln Property Co., developed the health club.

The Consulate-General of the United Kingdom in Houston was formerly located in Suite 1900. At one point the Consulate-General of Japan in Houston was located in Suite 5300 and later Suite 2300; as of 2008 the consulate now resides in 2 Houston Center. At one point the Consulate-General of Switzerland in Houston resided in Suite 5670; the mission, which at a later point moved to Two Allen Center, no longer exists.

The office of the US Attorney for the Southern District of Texas is located in Suite 2300.

When Hit Video USA existed, its studios were in the building.

Greenberg Trauig (one of the top ten largest law firms in the USA) is also a tenant of Wells Fargo Plaza.

The headquarters of Susman Godfrey is located in Wells Fargo Plaza.

== Gallery ==
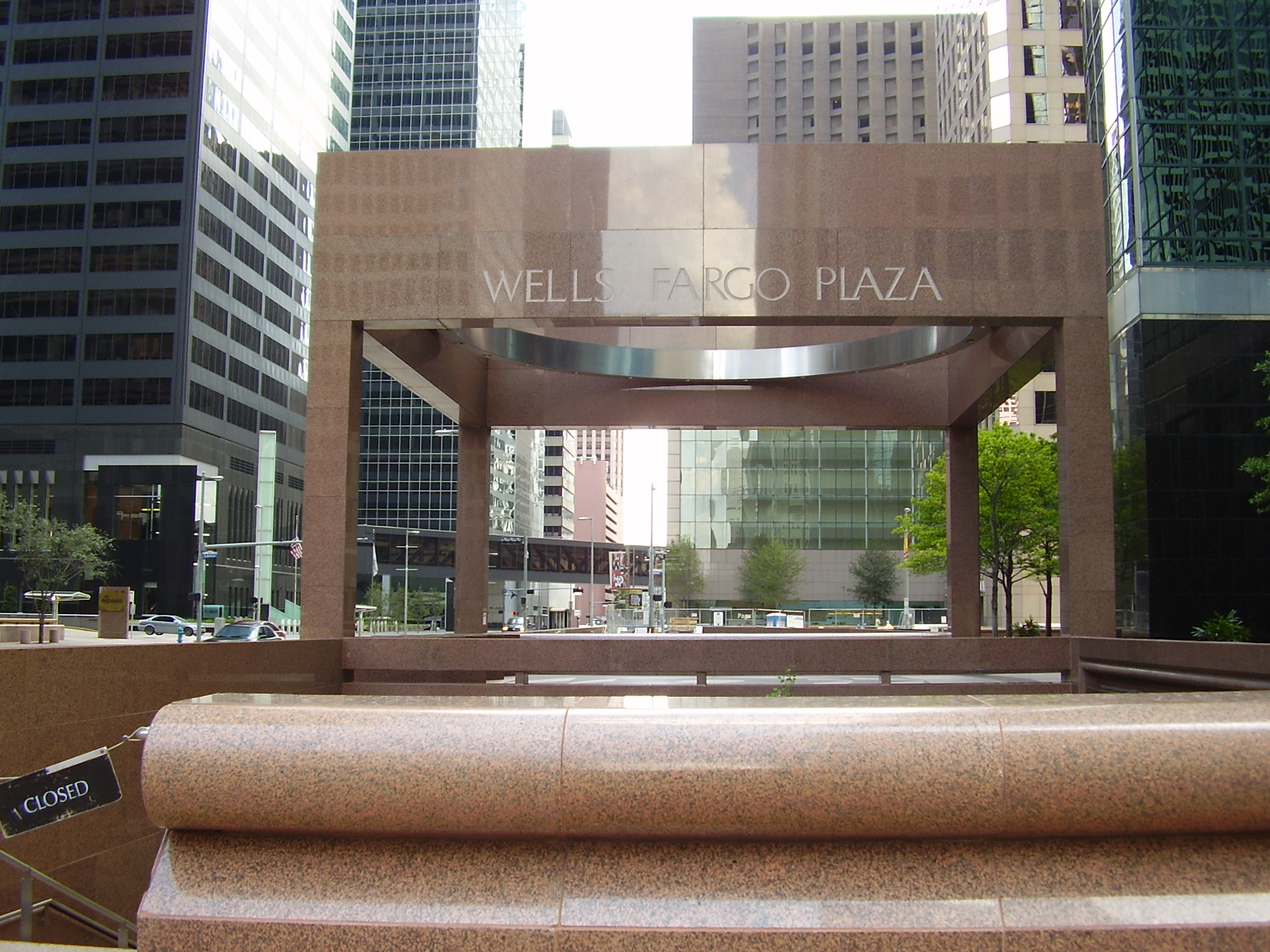
Entrance to the Wells Fargo Plaza

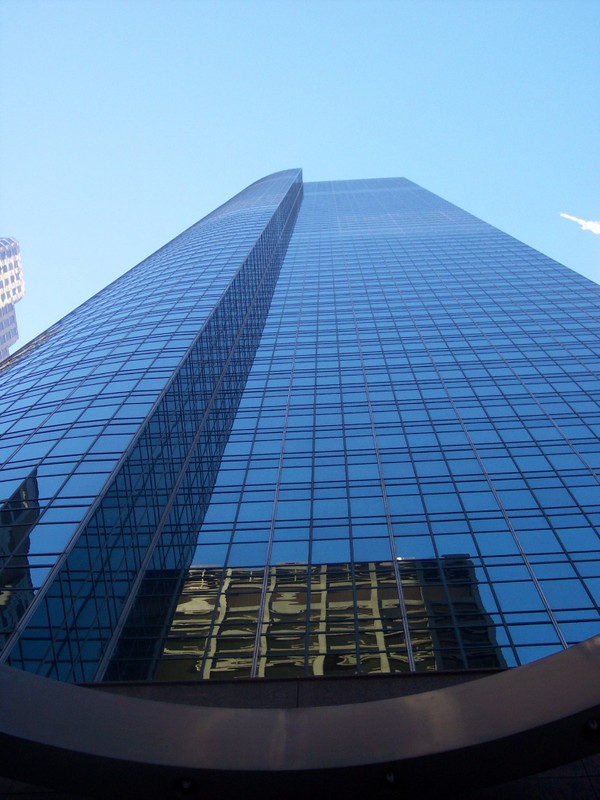
The sky above The Wells Fargo Plaza

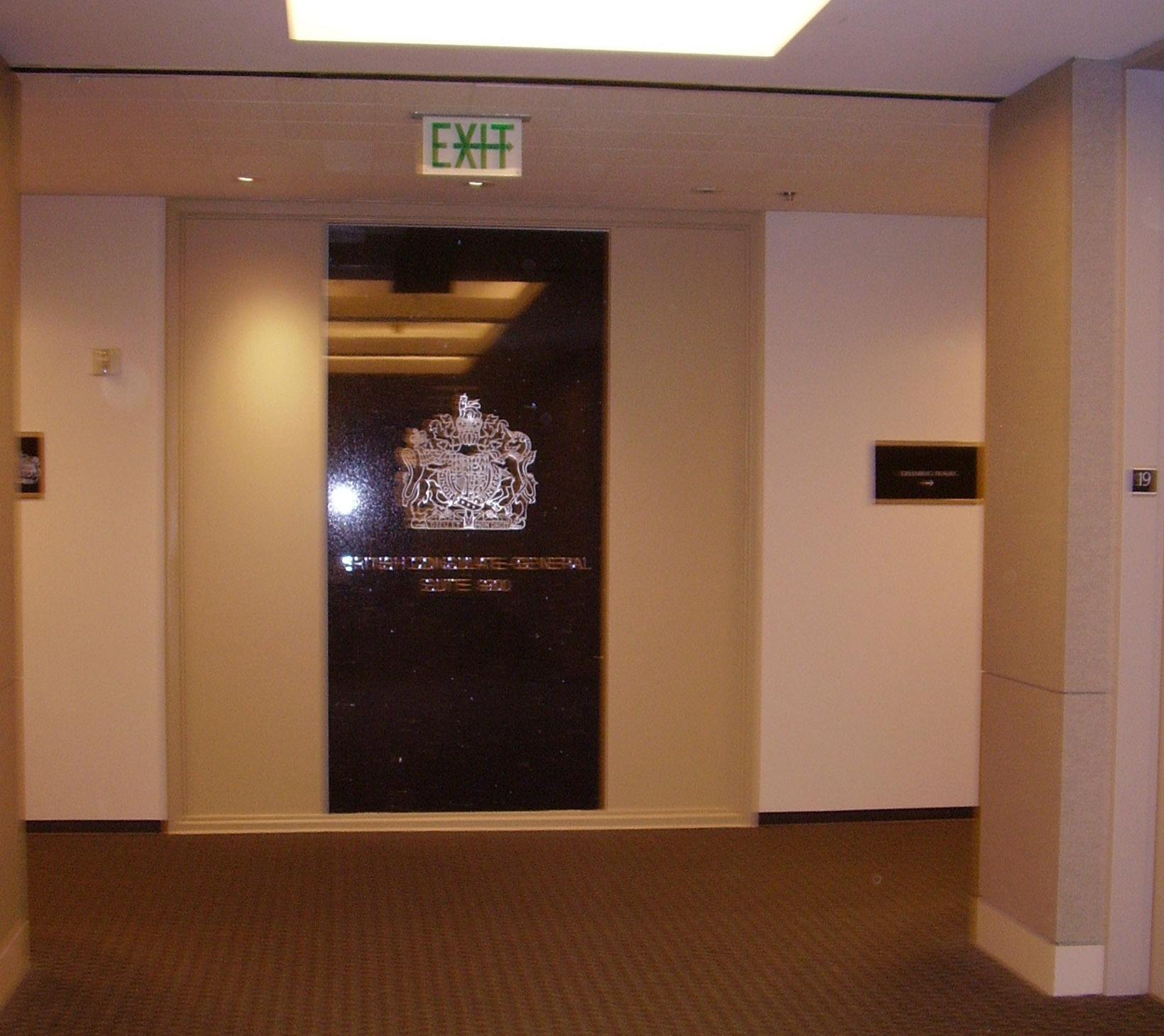
Consulate-General of the United Kingdom in Houston (former location) at Suite 1900

== See also ==
- Tallest buildings in Texas
- Tallest buildings in the United States
- List of tallest freestanding structures in the world
- List of tallest freestanding steel structures
