= JPMorgan Chase Tower (Houston) =

Skyscraper in Houston, Texas

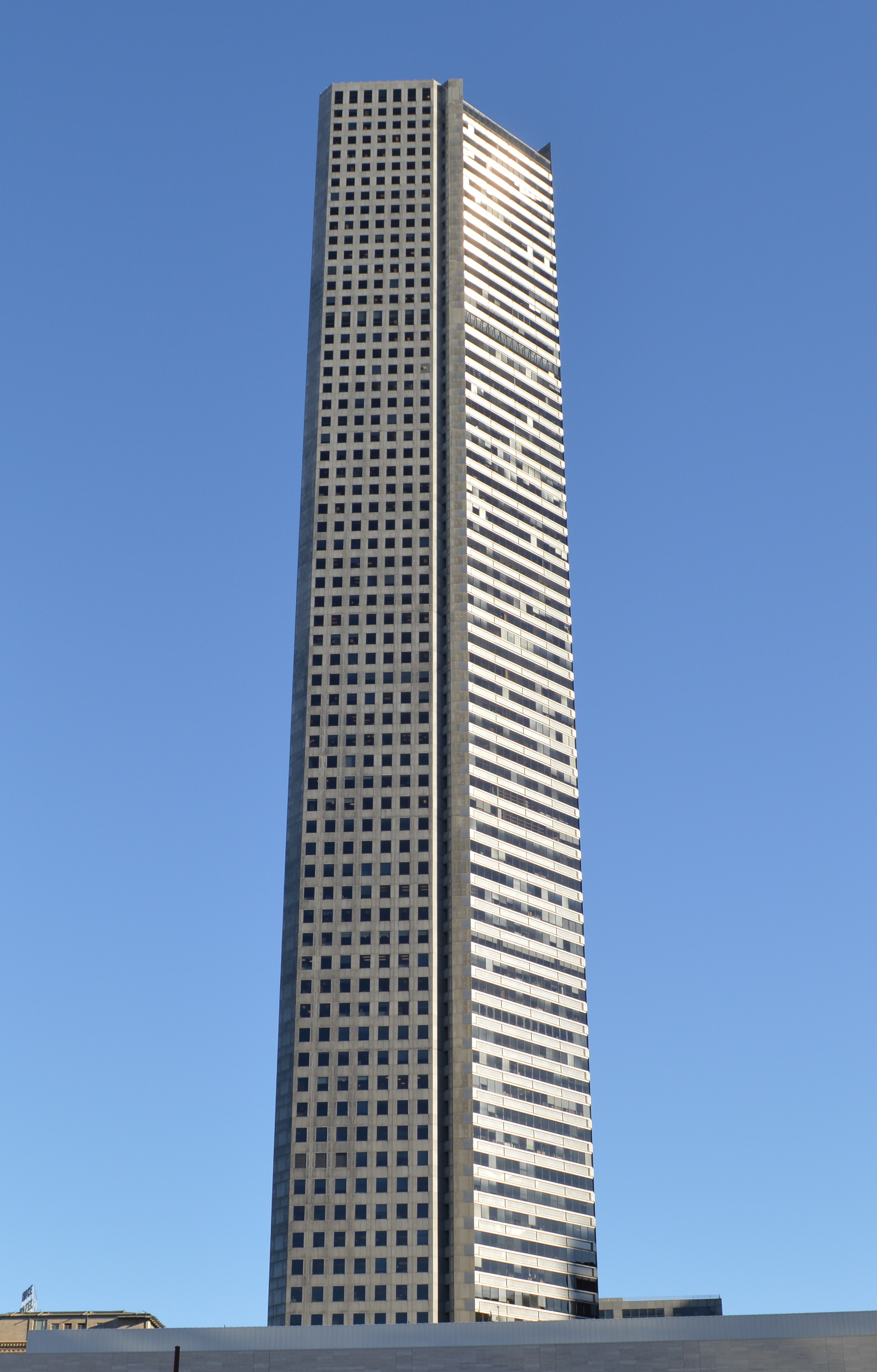
- The JPMorgan Chase Tower in 2013
- Former names: Texas Commerce Tower in United Energy Plaza; Texas Commerce Tower
- Alternative names: Chase Tower

General information
- Status: Completed
- Type: Commercial offices
- Architectural style: modernist
- Location: 600 Travis Street; Houston, Texas, U.S.
- Coordinates: 29.760556°N 95.363889°W
- Construction started: 1978
- Completed: 1982
- Cost: U.S. $2 billion
- Owner: Cerberus Capital Management and Hines Interests Limited Partnership

Height
- Architectural: 1,002 ft (305.4 m)
- Roof: 1,002 ft (305.4 m)
- Top floor: 974 ft (296.8 m)
- Observatory: 879 ft (268 m)

Technical details
- Floor count: 75
- Floor area: 2,243,013 sq ft (208,382.7 m^{2})
- Lifts/elevators: 52

Design and construction
- Architects: I. M. Pei & Partners; Ziegler Cooper Architects
- Developer: Hines Interests Limited Partnership
- Structural engineer: CBM Engineers
- Main contractor: Turner Construction

Website
- jpmctowerhouston.com

The JPMorgan Chase Tower, formerly Texas Commerce Tower, is a 1,002-foot (305.4-meter), 2,243,013-square-foot (208,382.7 m^{2}), 75-story skyscraper at 600 Travis Street in Downtown Houston, Texas, United States. It is the second tallest building in Texas, the tallest five-sided building in the world, the 29th-tallest building in the United States, and the 107th-tallest building in the world.

== Overview ==
Originally completed in 1981 as Texas Commerce Tower and commissioned by Texas Commerce Bancshares, the skyscraper attains a height of 1002 feet with 75 floors. Overlooking United Energy Plaza located on Capitol Avenue and Milam Street, it features the Joan Miro sculpture, Personage and Birds. A terrace on the plaza includes a water garden. Khalid bin Mahfouz was a co-developer of the building, part of which occupied the former Uptown Theatre, demolished in 1965.

Upon its completion, the building surpassed Aon Center in Los Angeles to become the tallest building in the United States west of the Mississippi River, a title it held until Los Angeles's Library Tower, now known as the U.S. Bank Tower, was built in 1989.

The JPMorgan Chase Tower held the record for "Tallest Building in Texas" longer than any other building in history. It was the tallest building in the state from its topping out in 1981 all the way until Waterline Austin's top out in 2025, making JPMorgan the tallest in the state for 44 years.

JPMorgan Chase Tower is connected to the Houston Downtown Tunnel System. This system forms a network of subterranean, climate-controlled, pedestrian walkways that link ninety-five city blocks. The lobby of JPMorgan Chase Tower has been designed to harmonize not only with the height of the structure but also with the portico of Jones Hall, home of the Houston Symphony Orchestra, and which occupies the city block immediately to the west. For that reason, a five-story glass wall supported by a stainless steel space frame spans the entire 85-foot width of the front entrance, making the lobby area light and airy, and opening up the space to the plaza outside. The Tower also includes 22,000 square feet (2,000 m^{2}) of retail space.

While the tower's name reflects the bank JPMorgan Chase, the only space designated to Chase was a single branch office on the bottom floor until 2021. The tower is owned by Cerberus Capital Management and Hines Interests.

== Hurricane Ike ==
On September 13, 2008, many of the tower's windows were blown out as Hurricane Ike struck the city, leaving desks exposed, metal blinds hanging in twisted heaps, and smoky black glass covering the streets below. Police were forced to cordon off the area due to the amount of debris in the streets.

At first, it was speculated that the glass came off the building due to impact from debris or due to high-speed winds in the confined spaces. However, flying glass debris must be entirely governed by drag and lift forces that overcome gravity for a considerable time period. Also, the high-wind-speed-in-confined-spaces theory is not entirely justified since the height of damage seen in the tower exceeded too significantly the height of the Chase Center parking garage next to the tower. This theory was proposed because an increase in wind speed produces a drop in external pressure. This drop in pressure at the side and leeward walls, combined with the normal, higher pressure inside the building would result in a force that could possibly overcome design pressures causing the window to separate. Other theories included those of ABS Consulting Engineers, who suggested that glazing damage may have been produced by "organized" vortices produced by the upwind Calpine Center and steady vortices between the Tower and the Chase Center parking garage.

The NatHaz Modeling Laboratory at the University of Notre Dame conducted an investigation of the flow field around the structure, modeling the tower and the immediate area surrounding it using computational fluid dynamics (CFD). A 2009 report by the laboratory's researchers suggests that the localized damage is the result of a combination of factors: the arrangement of nearby buildings, critical wind directionality, and the possible entrapment of debris within evolving airflow patterns.

== Fictional portrayals ==
- The building stood in for the headquarters of the fictional "Knox Oil & Gas Company" in the 1983 film Local Hero.
- The building stood in as the fictional location of Charles C. Foster's law office in the 2009 film Mao's Last Dancer.

== Gallery ==
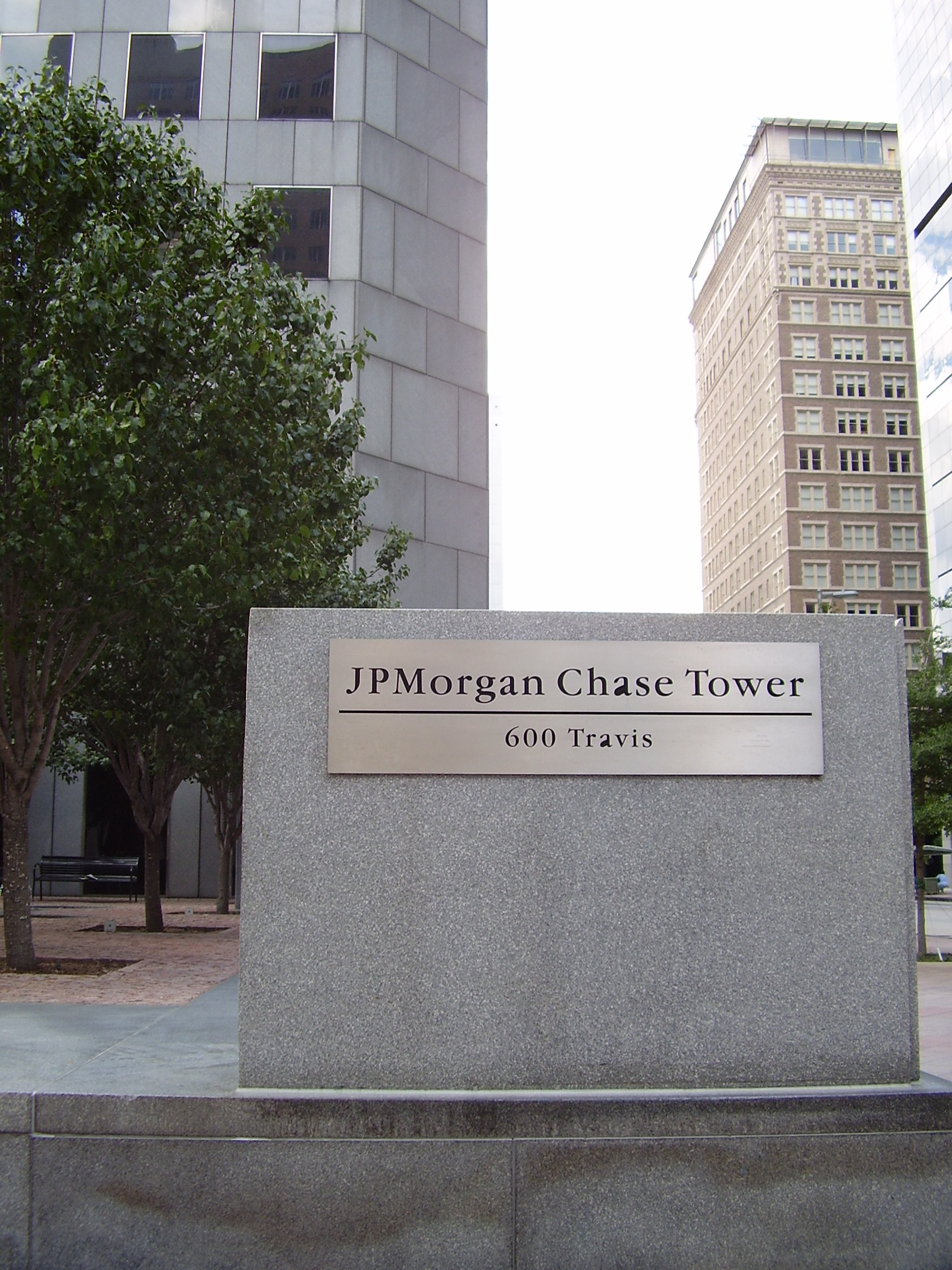
Entrance to the JPMorgan Chase Tower

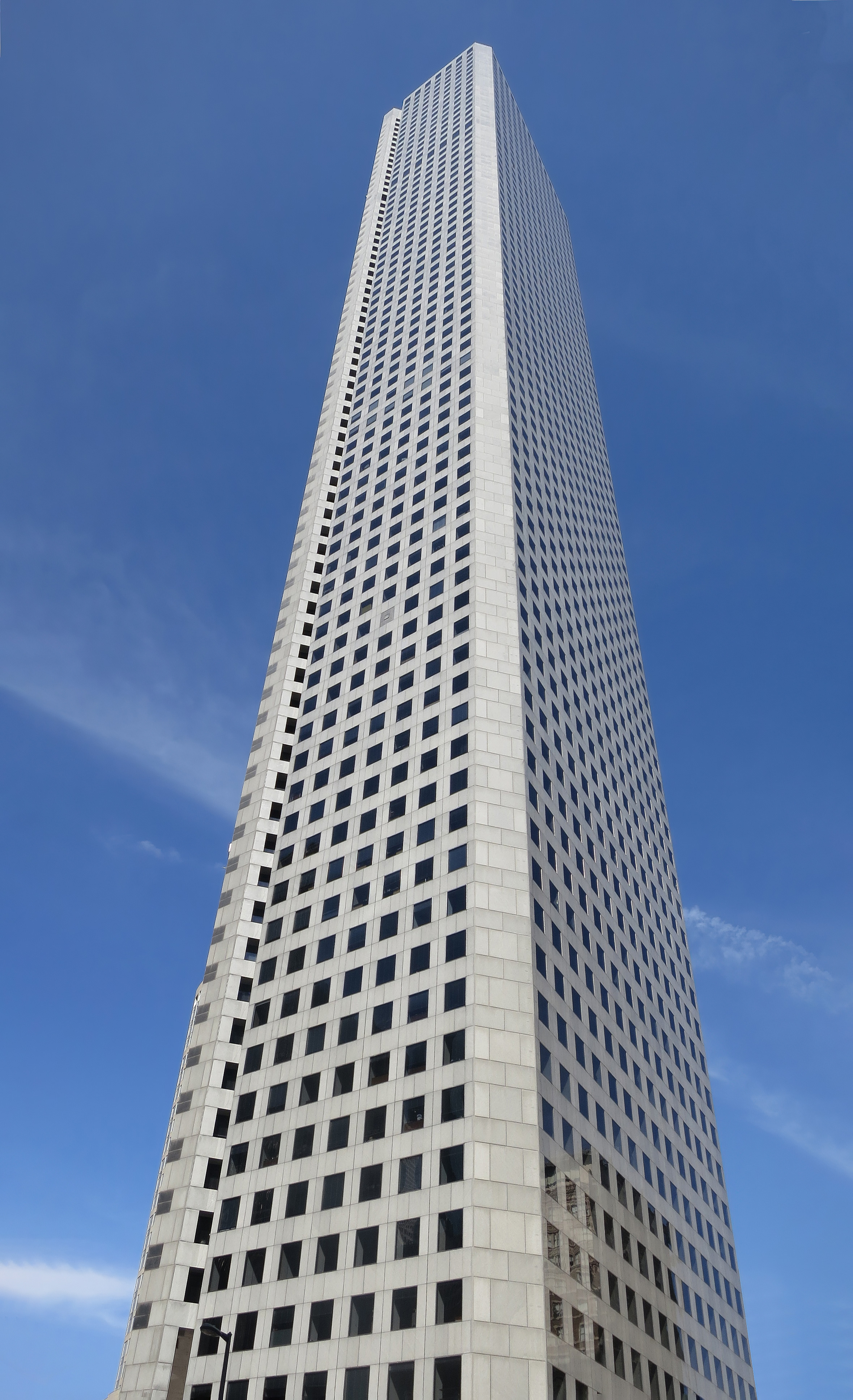
JPMorgan Chase Tower on a January day

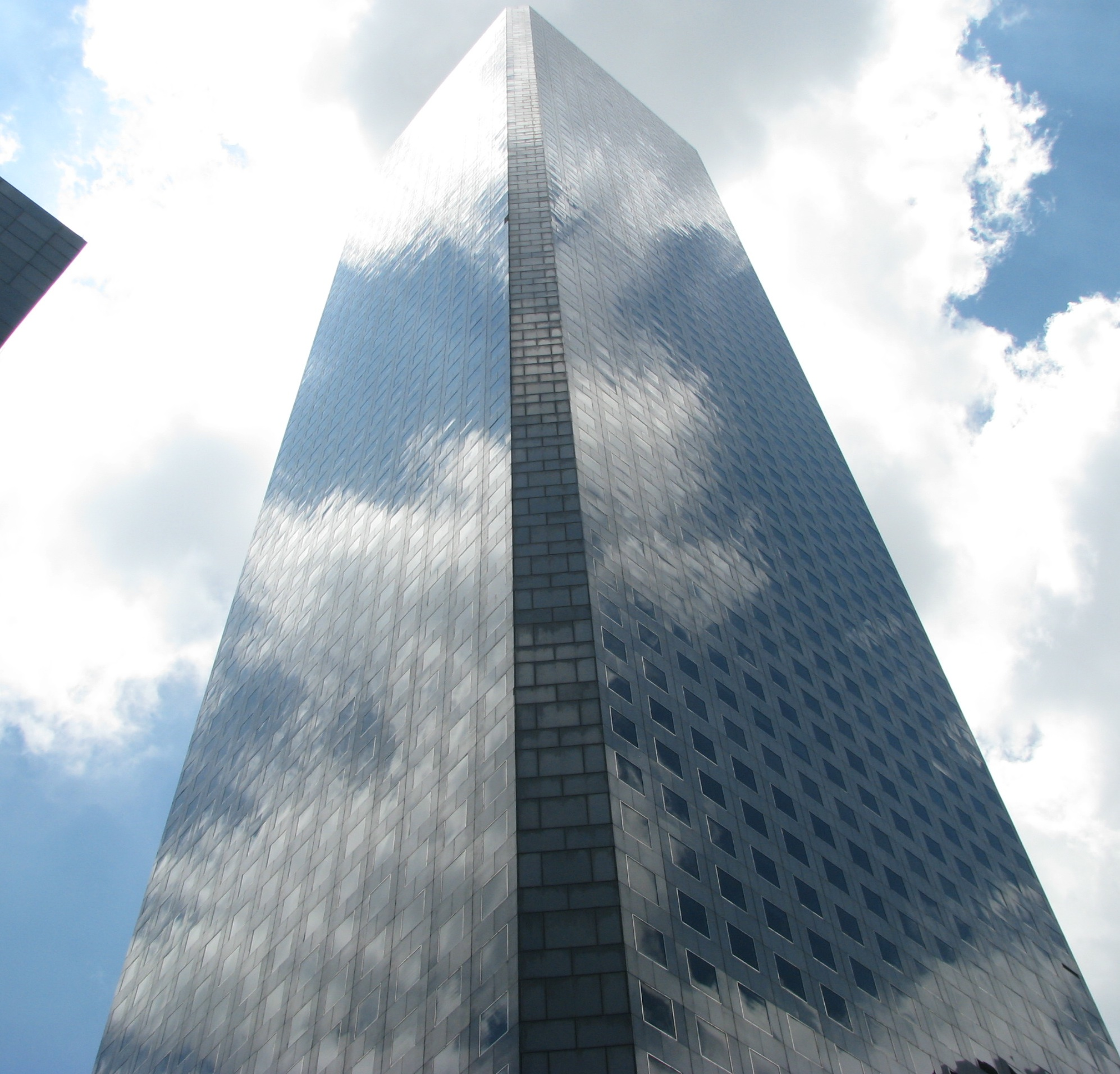
JPMorgan Chase Tower from the rear

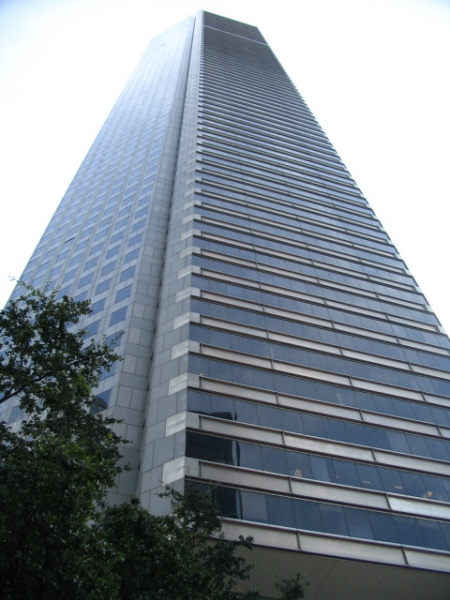
JPMorgan Chase Tower as viewed from ground level

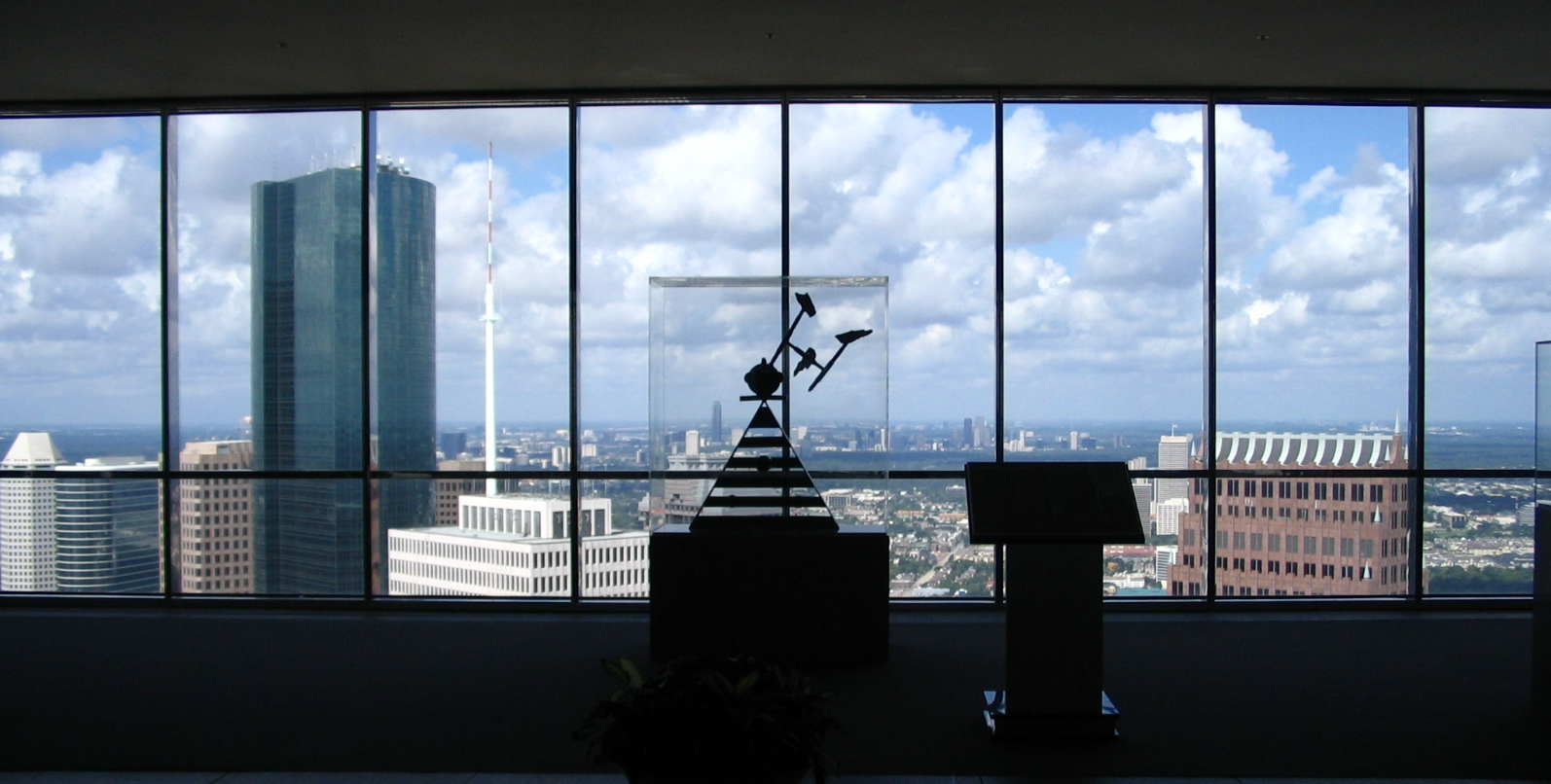
View from the Sky Lobby facing south west Houston. Visible are the Wells Fargo Plaza (left) and Williams Tower in the far background

JP Morgan Chase Tower during a summer afternoon

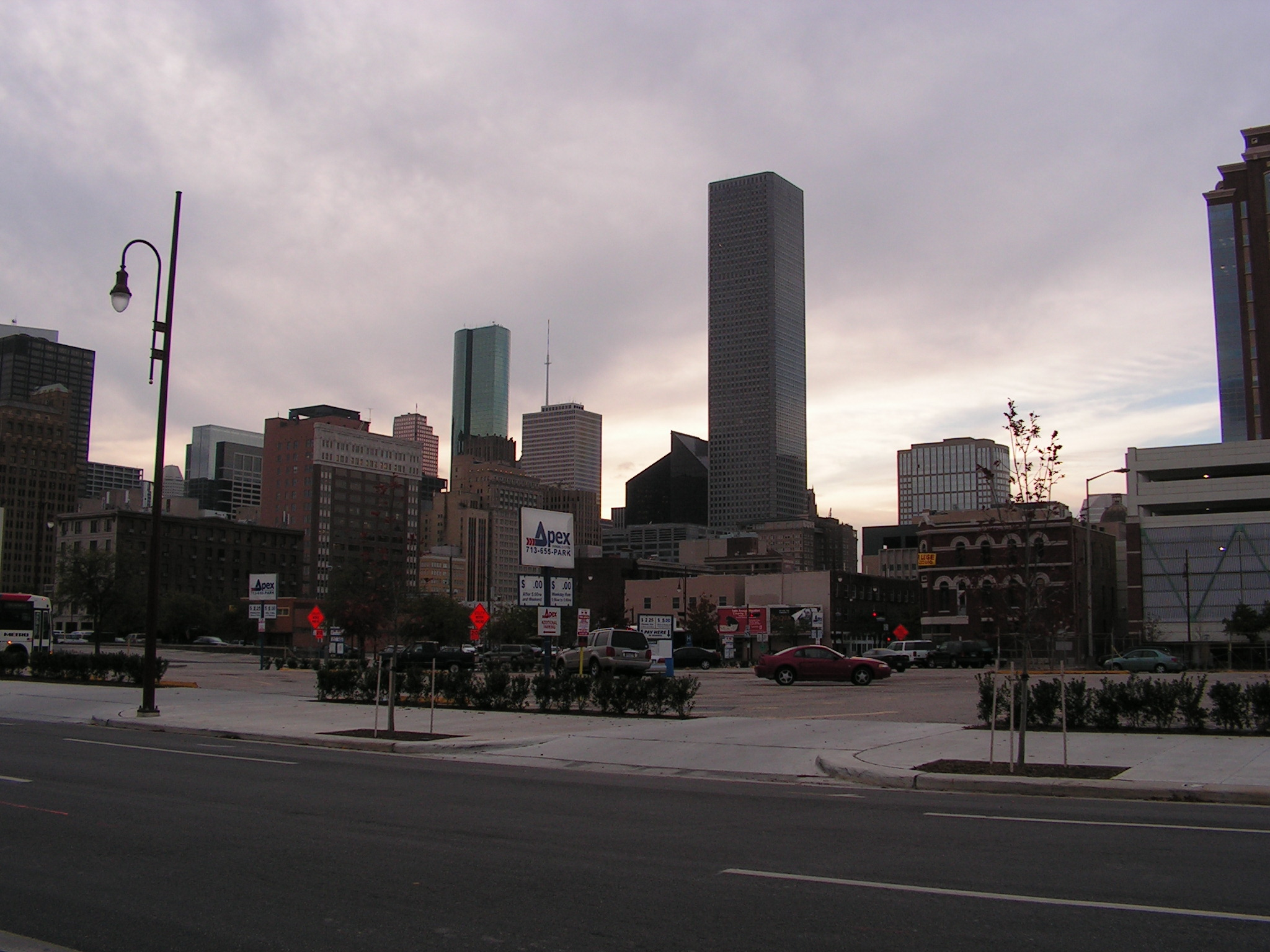
The building as seen from a parking lot north of Daikin Park

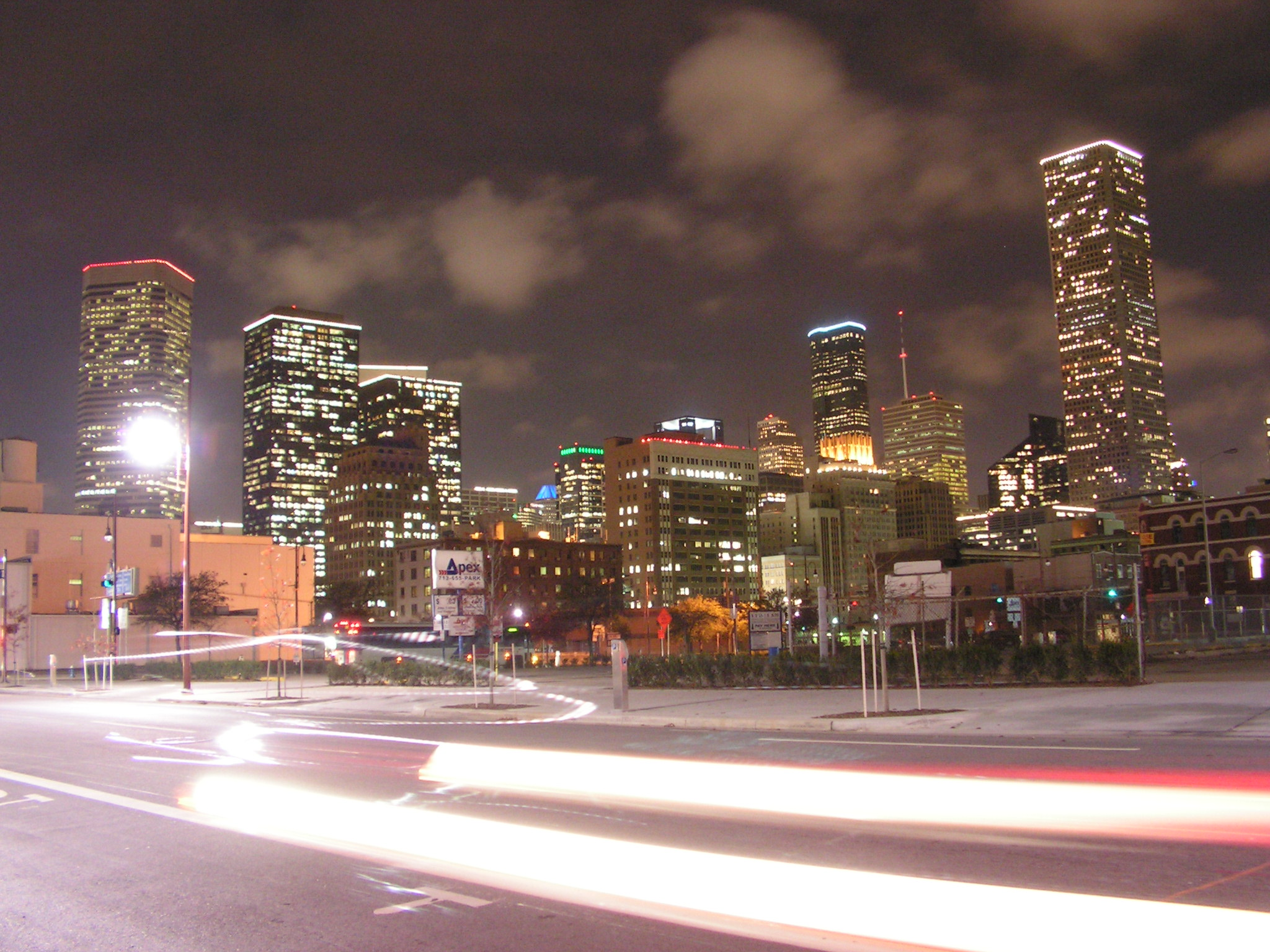
Houston evening skyline from the same parking lot with J.P. Morgan Chase Tower on far right

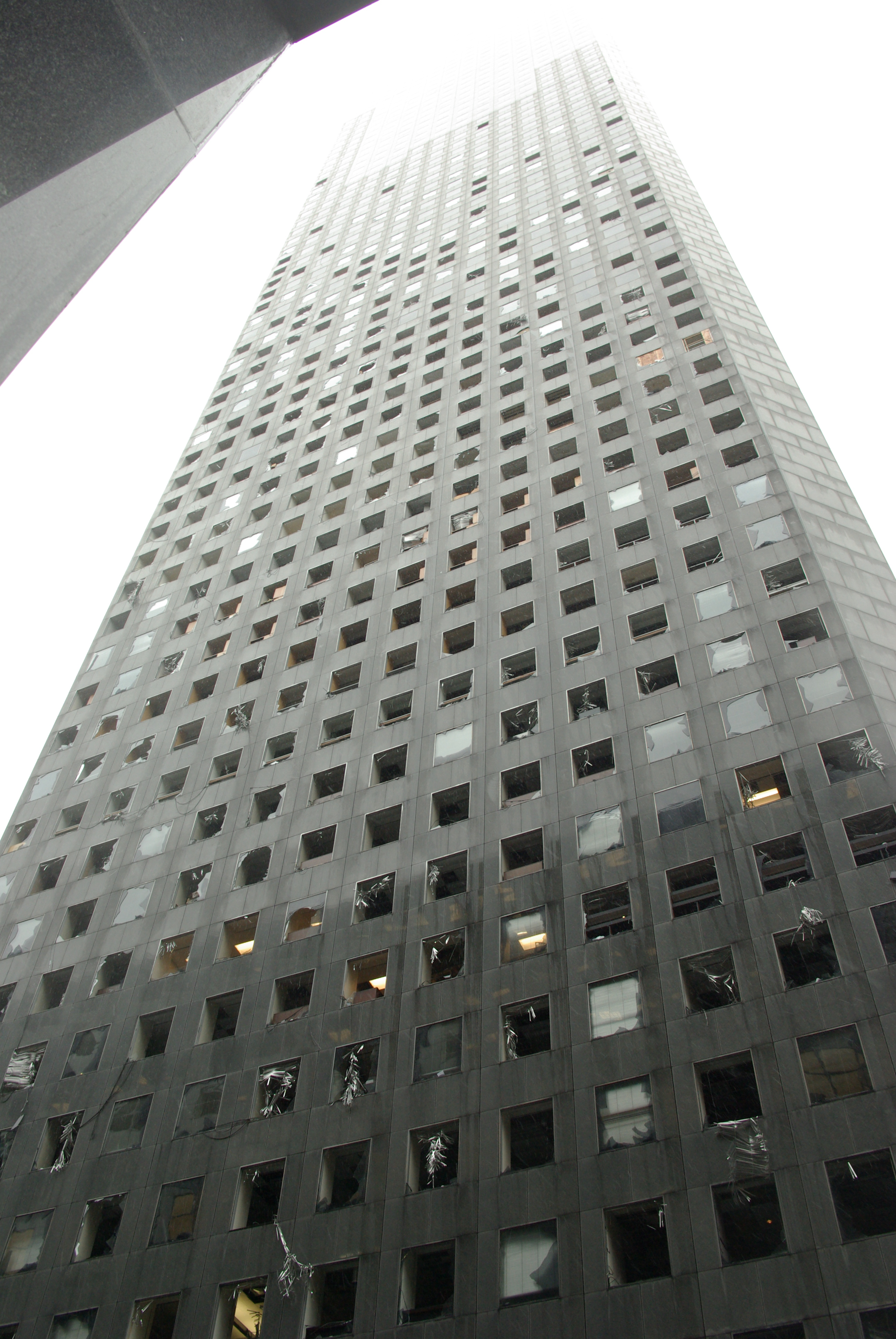
Damage to the JP Morgan Chase Tower after Hurricane Ike

== See also ==
- List of tallest buildings in Houston
- List of tallest buildings by U.S. state
- List of tallest buildings in Texas
- List of tallest buildings in the United States
- Gulf Building (Houston)

== Bibliography ==
- Bradley, Barrie Scardino (2020). Improbable Metropolis: Houston's Architectural and Urban History. Austin: University of Texas Press. ISBN 978-1-4773-2019-8.
- Fox, Stephen (2012). AIA Houston Architectural Guide (Third ed.). Houston: American Institute of Architects, Houston Chapter. ISBN 978-0-615-66959-5.

Records
Preceded by Aon Center (Los Angeles)	Tallest building in the United States west of Mississippi River; 1982–1989	Succeeded by U.S. Bank Tower
