= Architecture of Houston =

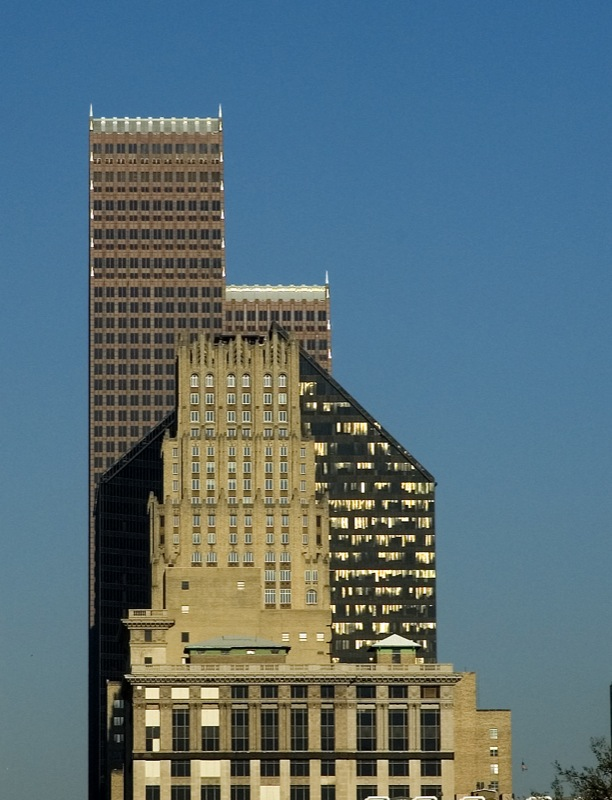
Three eras of buildings in Houston - JPMorgan Chase Building, 1920s, Pennzoil Place, 1970s, and Bank of America Center, 1980s

The architecture of Houston includes a wide variety of award-winning and historic examples located in various areas of the city of Houston, Texas. From early in its history to current times, the city inspired innovative and challenging building design and construction, as it quickly grew into an internationally recognized commercial and industrial hub of Texas and the United States.

Some of Houston's oldest and most distinctive architecture is found downtown, as the city grew around Allen's Landing and the Market Square historic district. During the middle and late century, Downtown Houston was a modest collection of mid-rise office structures, but has since grown into the third largest skyline in the United States. The Uptown District experienced rapid growth along with Houston during the 1970s and early 1980s. In the late 1990s Uptown Houston saw construction of many mid and high-rise residential buildings. The Uptown District is also home to other structures designed by architects such as I. M. Pei, César Pelli and Philip Johnson.

Houston has many examples of residential architecture of varying styles, from the mansions of River Oaks and Memorial to row houses in the several wards. A number of Houston's earliest homes are located in what is now Sam Houston Park. Homes in the Heights have varied architectural styles, including Victorian, Craftsman and Colonial Revival. Post-war housing constructed throughout Houston reflects many architectural styles.

== Skyscrapers ==
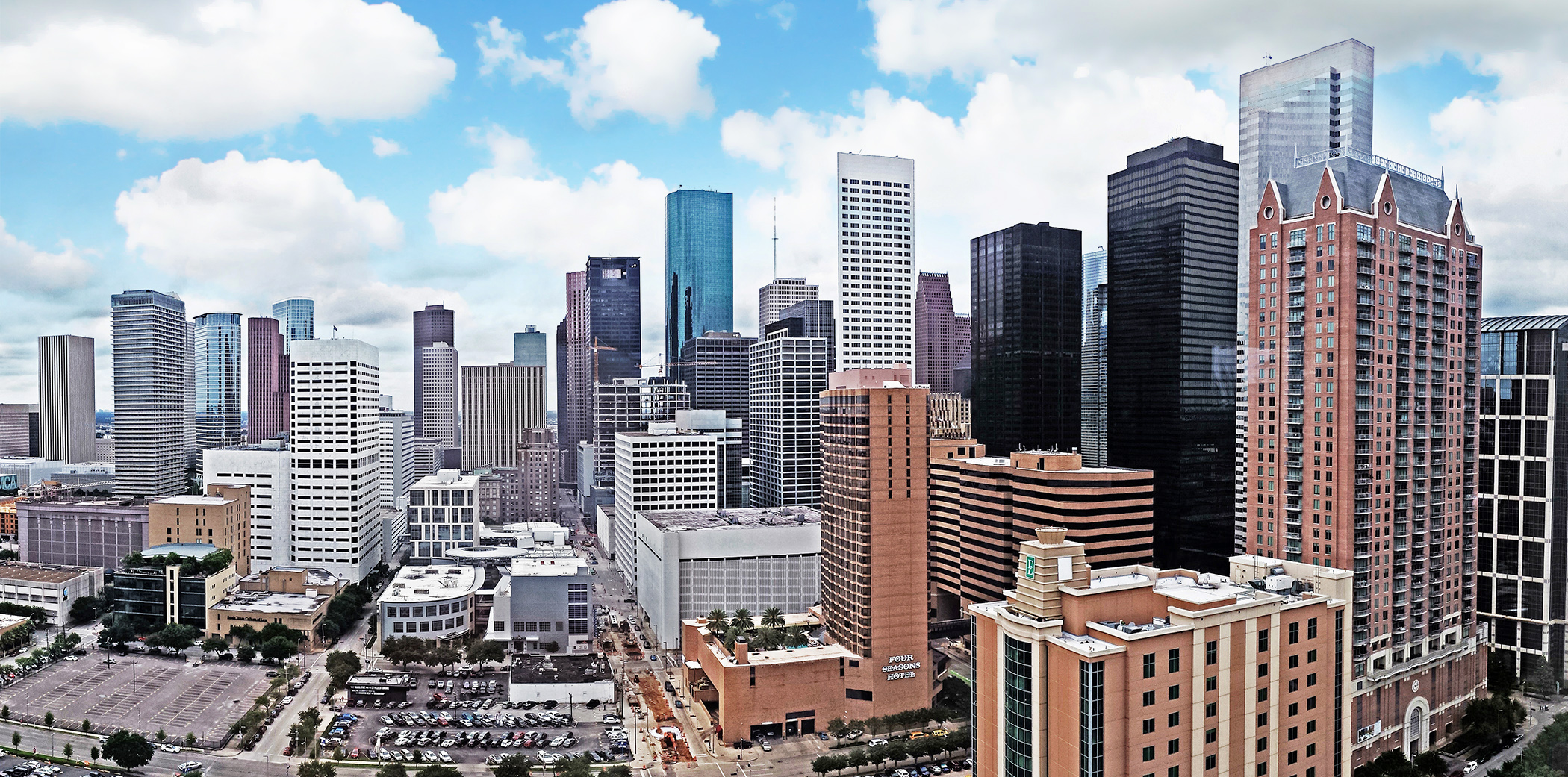
The Downtown Houston skyline

Some of Houston's oldest and most distinctive architecture are found in the northern sections of downtown, as the city grew around Allen's Landing and the Market Square historic district, where several representations of 19th-century urban architecture still stand.

The Hilton Houston Post Oak (formerly Warwick Post Oak) Hotel was designed by I. M. Pei. Its twin towers are joined by a spacious lobby with a curved glass ceiling that by day lights up the entire space. The hotel has more than 30,000 sq ft (2,800 m^{2}). of meeting space and 448 guestrooms, including two 3,000 sq ft (280 m^{2}). presidential suites and is only one block from the Galleria. In 2005, the hotel was renovated to reflect a more contemporary style that mirrors the original design.

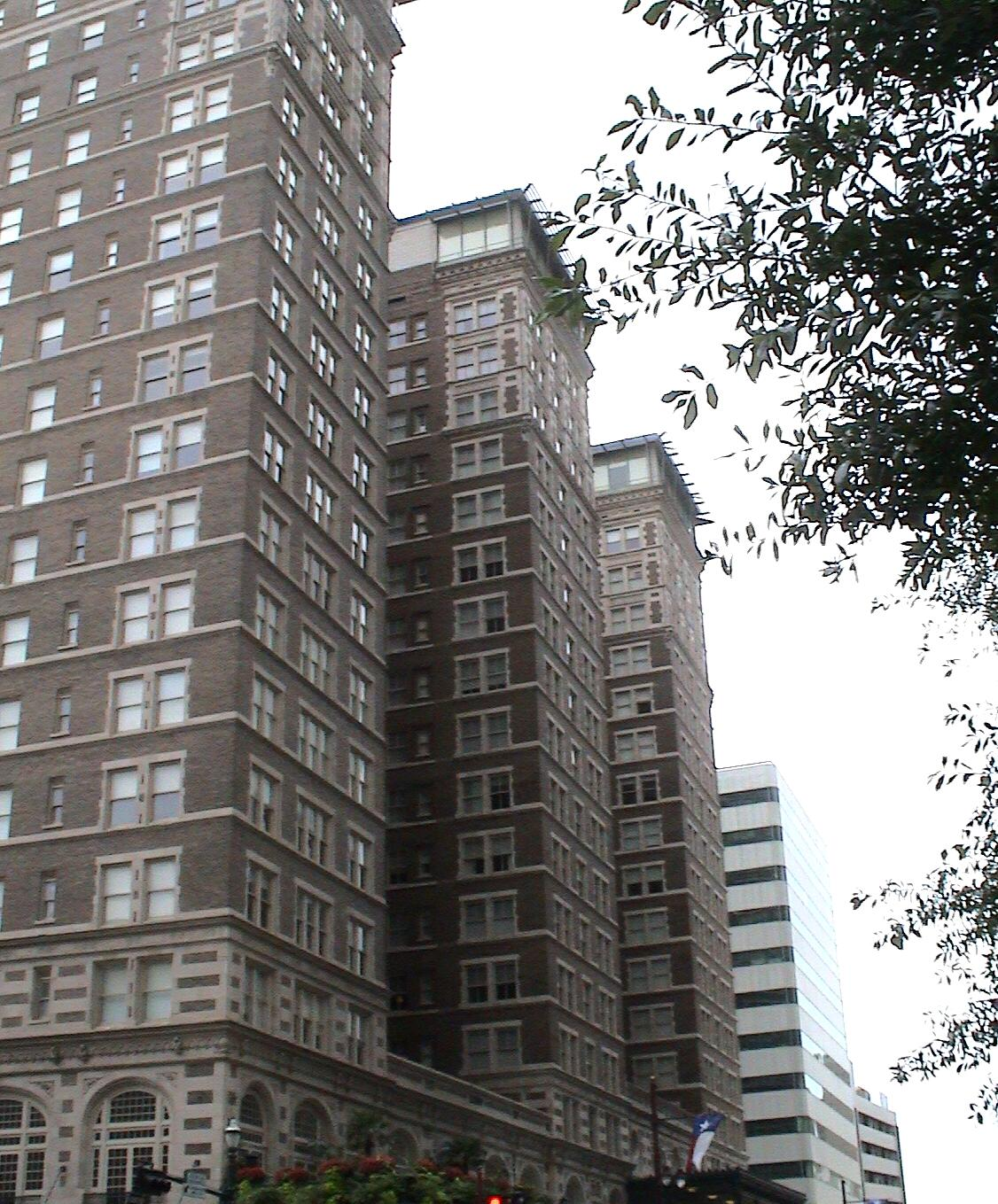
The Rice Lofts (formerly the Rice Hotel)

The Rice Hotel, built in 1912 on the former site of the old Capitol building of the Republic of Texas, was restored in 1998, after years of standing unused. The original building was razed in 1881 by Colonel A. Groesbeck, who subsequently erected a five-story hotel named the Capitol Hotel. William Marsh Rice, the founder of Rice University, purchased the building in 1883, added a five-story annex, and renamed it the Rice Hotel. Rice University then sold the building in 1911 to Jesse Jones, who demolished it and built a 17-story structure on the site. The new Rice Hotel building opened on May 17, 1913. This historic hotel now serves as an apartment building known as The Rice Lofts, designed by Page.

The Texas State Hotel was built in 1926 from a design by architect Joseph Finger, who also created the plans for Houston's City Hall. The hotel has Spanish Renaissance detailing and ornate metal canopies, which remain largely intact even though the building had, until recently, been vacant since the mid-1980s. The hotel is a designated City of Houston landmark, and with refurbished ornate terra cotta detailing on the façade, it has been returned to active use.

The Gulf Building, now called the JPMorgan Chase building, is an Art Deco skyscraper. Completed in 1929, it remained the tallest building in Houston until 1963, when the Exxon Building surpassed it in height. Designed by architects Alfred C. Finn (designer of the San Jacinto Monument), Kenneth Franzheim, and J.E.R. Carpenter, the building is seen as a realization of Eliel Saarinen's acclaimed second-place entry to the Chicago Tribune Tower competition. Restoration of the building was started in 1989, in what is still considered one of the largest privately funded preservation projects in American history.

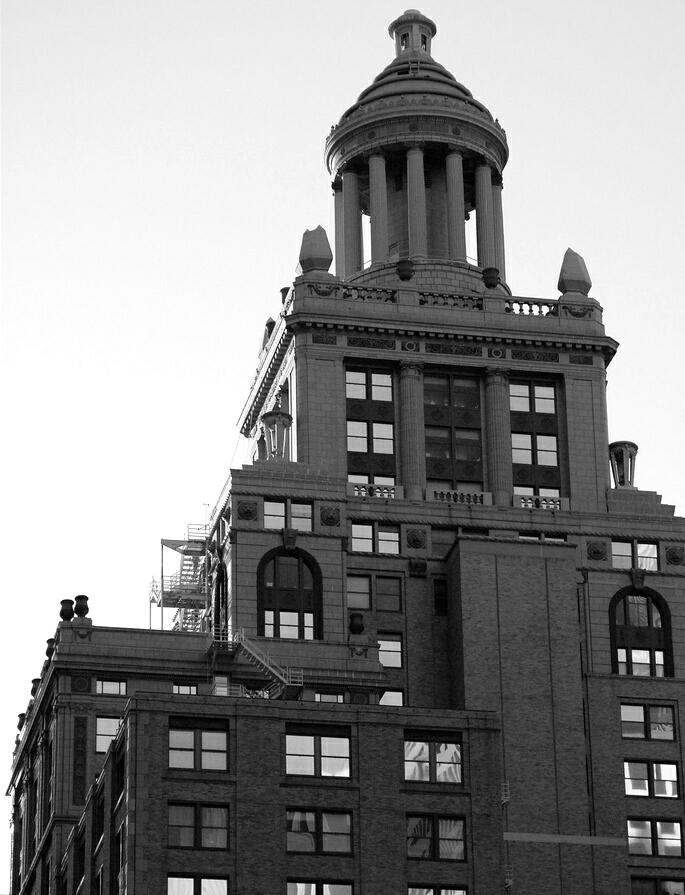
Niels Esperson Building

The Niels and Mellie Esperson buildings are examples of Italian Renaissance architecture in downtown Houston. Designed by John Eberson, the two buildings were built in 1927 and 1941, respectively. They are detailed with massive columns, great urns, terraces, and a grand tempietto at the top, similar to one built in the courtyard of San Pietro in Rome in 1502. Mellie Esperson had the first building constructed for her husband, Niels, a real estate and oil tycoon. His name is carved on the side of the building in large letters at street level. The name "Mellie Esperson" is carved on the accompanying structure, known as the Mellie Esperson building, although it is really just a 19-story annex to the original building.

Designed by Fort Worth architect Wyatt C. Hedrick, the Shamrock Hotel was an 18-story building constructed between 1946 and 1949 with a green tile pitched roof and 1,100 rooms. The hotel was conceived by wildcatter Glenn McCarthy as a city-sized hotel scaled for conventions with a resort atmosphere. The Shamrock was located in a suburban area three miles (5 km) southwest of downtown Houston on the fringes of countryside and was meant to be the first phase of a much larger indoor shopping and entertainment complex called McCarthy Center, anchored alongside the planned Texas Medical Center. At the hotel's north side was a five-story building containing a 1,000-car garage and 25,000-square-foot (2,300 m^{2}) exhibition hall. To the south was the hotel's lavishly landscaped garden designed by Ralph Ellis Gunn, a terrace and an immense swimming pool measuring 165 by 142 feet (43 m) described as the world's biggest outdoor pool, which accommodated exhibition waterskiing and featured a three-story-high diving platform with an open spiral staircase. Despite protests by local preservationists, the Shamrock was demolished June 1, 1987. The Institute of Biosciences and Technology now stands in its former location.

The 18-story Prudential Building, designed by Kenneth Franzheim, was constructed in 1952 in the Texas Medical Center. The ground level walls of the Prudential Building were clad with deep red polished Texas granite; the upper floors on the northwest and northeast sides were clad in Texas limestone. The southwest and southeast sides, though, were faced with full-height aluminum arrangements to "utilize solar rays and air circulation to effect economies in air conditioning." The building was the first local corporate high rise office building in Houston to be located outside of the central business district. The Prudential Building was demolished January 8, 2012.

In the 1960s, Downtown Houston was a modest collection of mid-rise office structures, but has since grown into the third largest skyline in the United States. In 1960, the central business district had 10 million square feet (1,000,000 m^{2}) of office space, increasing to about 16 million square feet (1,600,000 m^{2}) in 1970. Downtown Houston was on the threshold of a boom in 1970 with 8.7 million square feet (870,000 m^{2}) of office space planned or under construction and huge projects being launched by real estate developers.

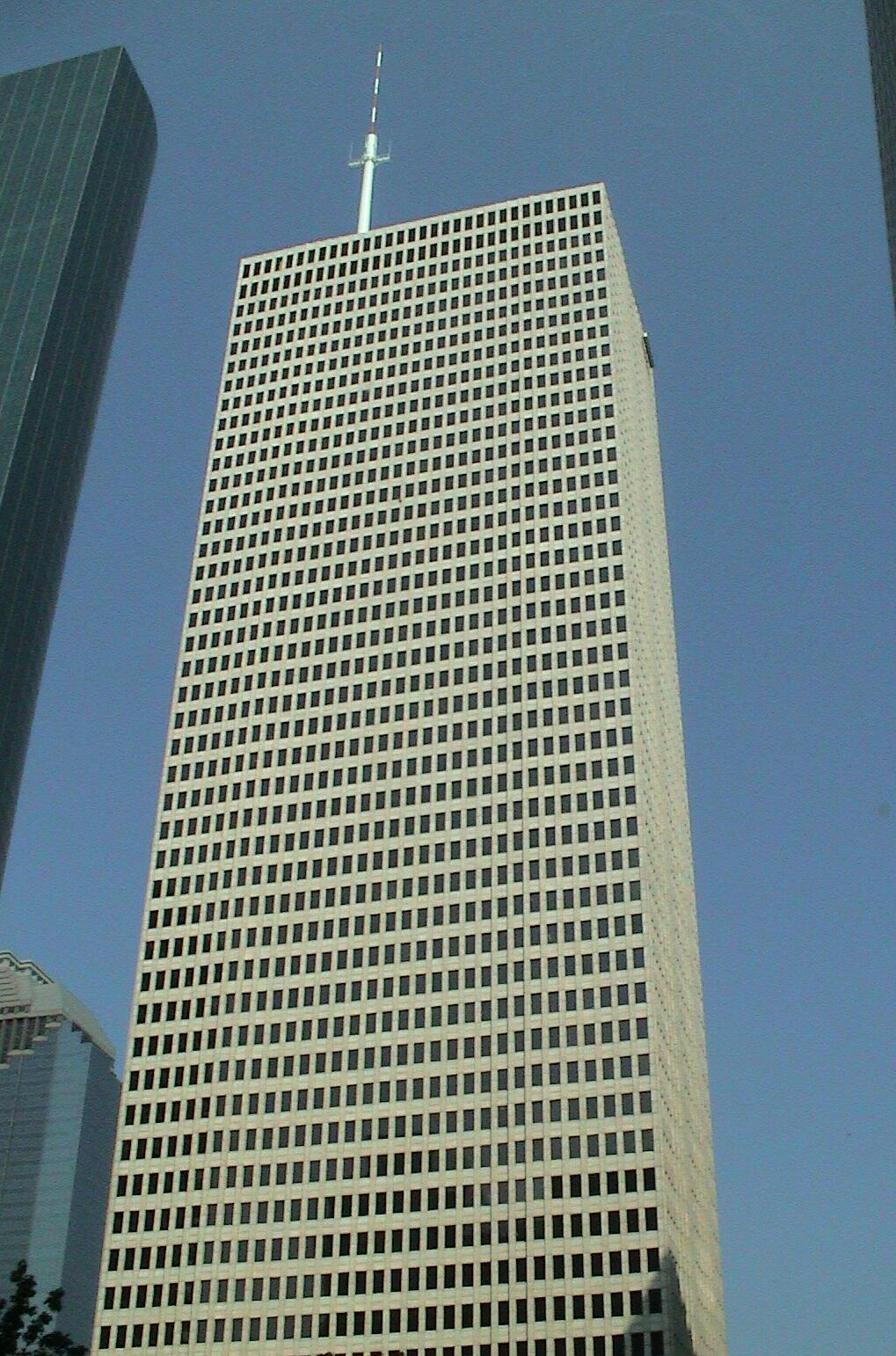
One Shell Plaza

The largest proposed development was Houston Center, originally planned to encompass a 32-block area. However, by 1989, when the company that acquired the original developer sold Houston Center, the complex consisted of three office buildings, a shopping center, and a hotel. Other large projects included the Cullen Center, Allen Center, and towers for Shell Oil Company. The surge of skyscrapers mirrored the skyscraper booms in other sunbelt cities, such as Los Angeles and Dallas. Houston had experienced another downtown construction spurt in the 1970s with the energy industry boom.

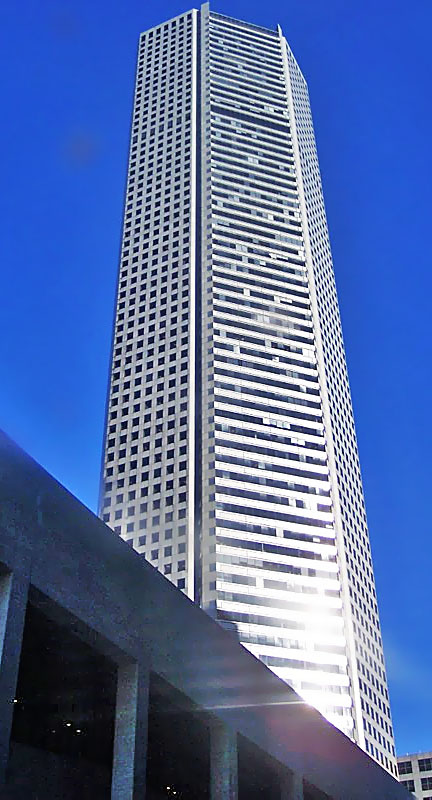
JPMorgan Chase Tower

The first major skyscraper to be constructed in Houston was the 50-floor, 714-foot (218 m) tall One Shell Plaza in 1971. A succession of skyscrapers were built throughout the 1970s, culminating with Houston's tallest, the 75-floor, 1,002-foot (305 m) tall JPMorgan Chase Tower (formerly the Texas Commerce Tower), designed by I. M. Pei and completed in 1982. As of 2010, it is the tallest man-made structure in Texas, the 12th-tallest building in the United States and the 48th-tallest skyscraper in the world.

Pennzoil Place, designed by Philip Johnson and built in 1976, is Houston's most award-winning skyscraper and is known for its innovative design. The 46-story One Houston Center, which was built in 1978, is 207 m (678 ft) tall and was designed by S.I. Morris Associates, Caudill Rowlett Scott, and 3D/International.

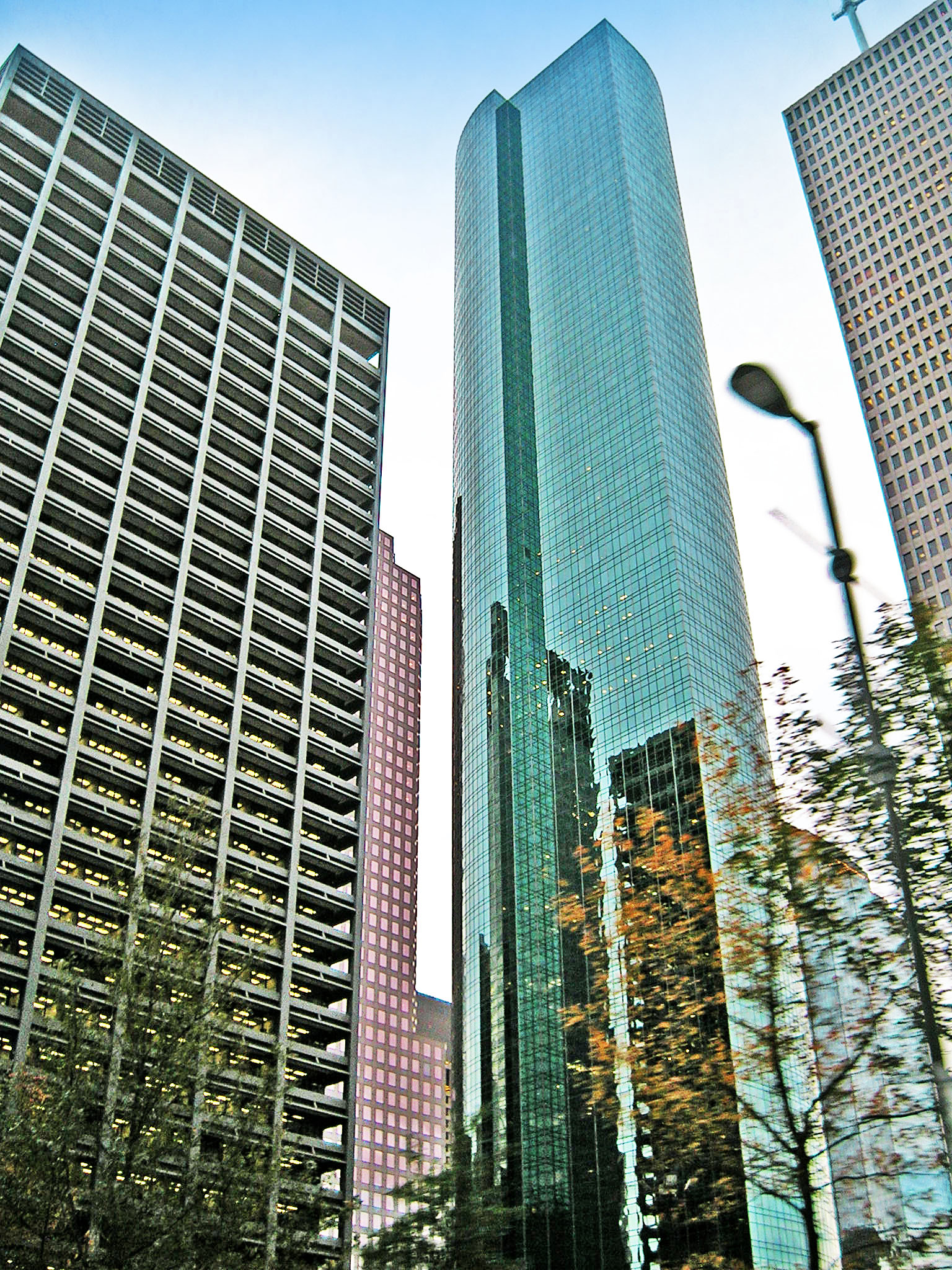
Wells Fargo Bank Plaza

The Fulbright Tower, built in 1982 and designed by Caudill Rowlett & Scott Architects, is a 52-story tower constructed of steel with suspended concrete on metal deck floor slabs. The exterior wall consists of a ribbon window wall with granite spandrel panels and aluminum framed windows with insulated glazing. The spandrel panels are polished granite supported by a steel truss system. The interior wall surfaces are constructed of Italian flame cut Rosa Beta granite, quarried in Sardinia, mixed with Makore wood and stainless steel trim.

In 1983, the Wells Fargo Bank Plaza was completed, which became the second-tallest building in Houston and in Texas, and the 11th-tallest in the country. It was designed by Skidmore, Owings & Merrill and Lloyd Jones Brewer and Associates and supposedly resembles an abstracted dollar sign in plan. From street level, the building is 71 stories tall, or 972 ft (296 m) tall. It also extends four more stories below street level.

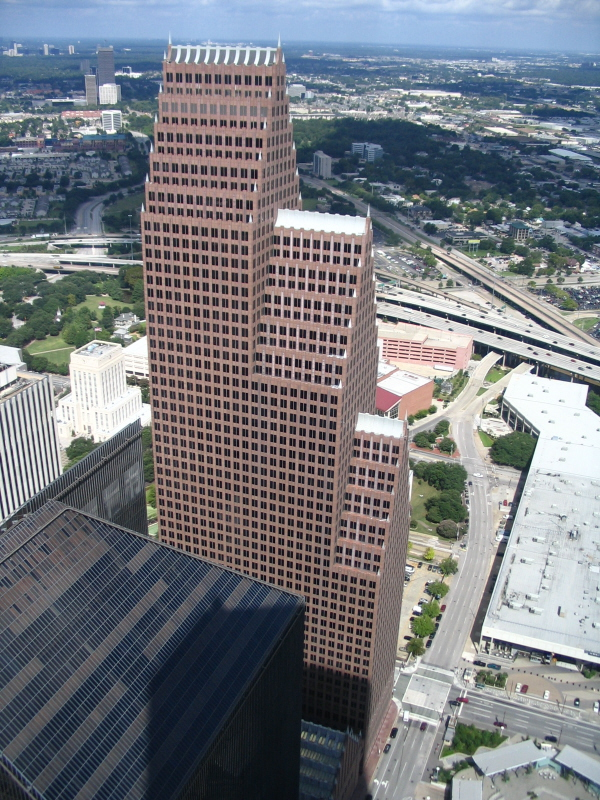
The Bank of America Center

The Bank of America Center is one of the first significant examples of postmodern architecture built in downtown Houston. The building, completed in 1984 and designed by Philip Johnson and partner John Burgee, is reminiscent of the Dutch Gothic architecture of canal houses that were once common in The Netherlands. The first section is 21 stories tall, while the whole building reaches a height of 56 stories.

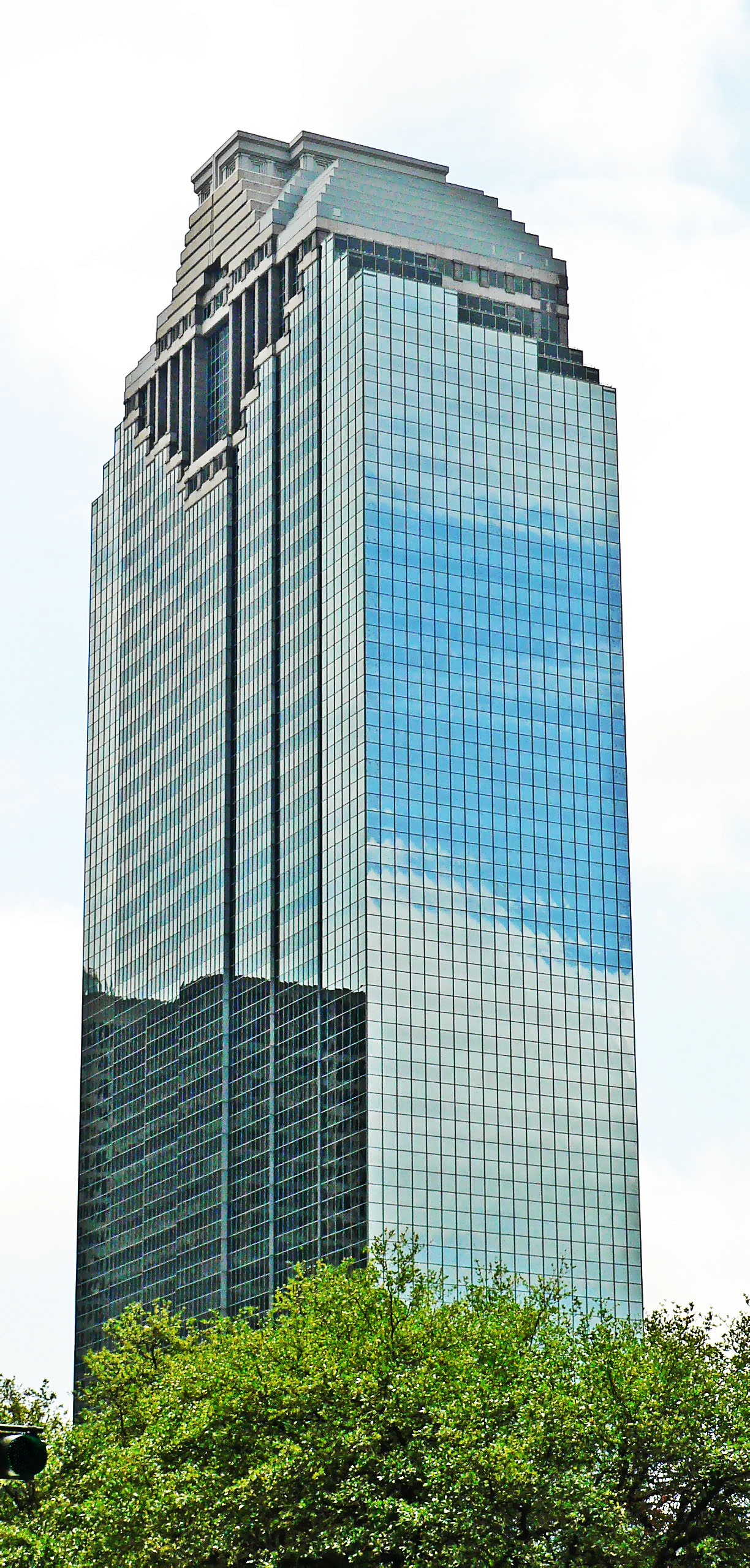
Heritage Plaza building as seen from the Theater District

Heritage Plaza is a 53-story, 232 m, tower in downtown. The building, designed by M. Nasar & Partners P.C., was completed in 1986. The building is known for the granite Mayan temple design on the top, which was inspired by the architect's visit to the Mexican Yucatán. Recently renovated at the cost of $6 million, the building was the last major office building completed in downtown Houston prior to the collapse of the Texas real estate, banking, and oil industries in the 1980s.

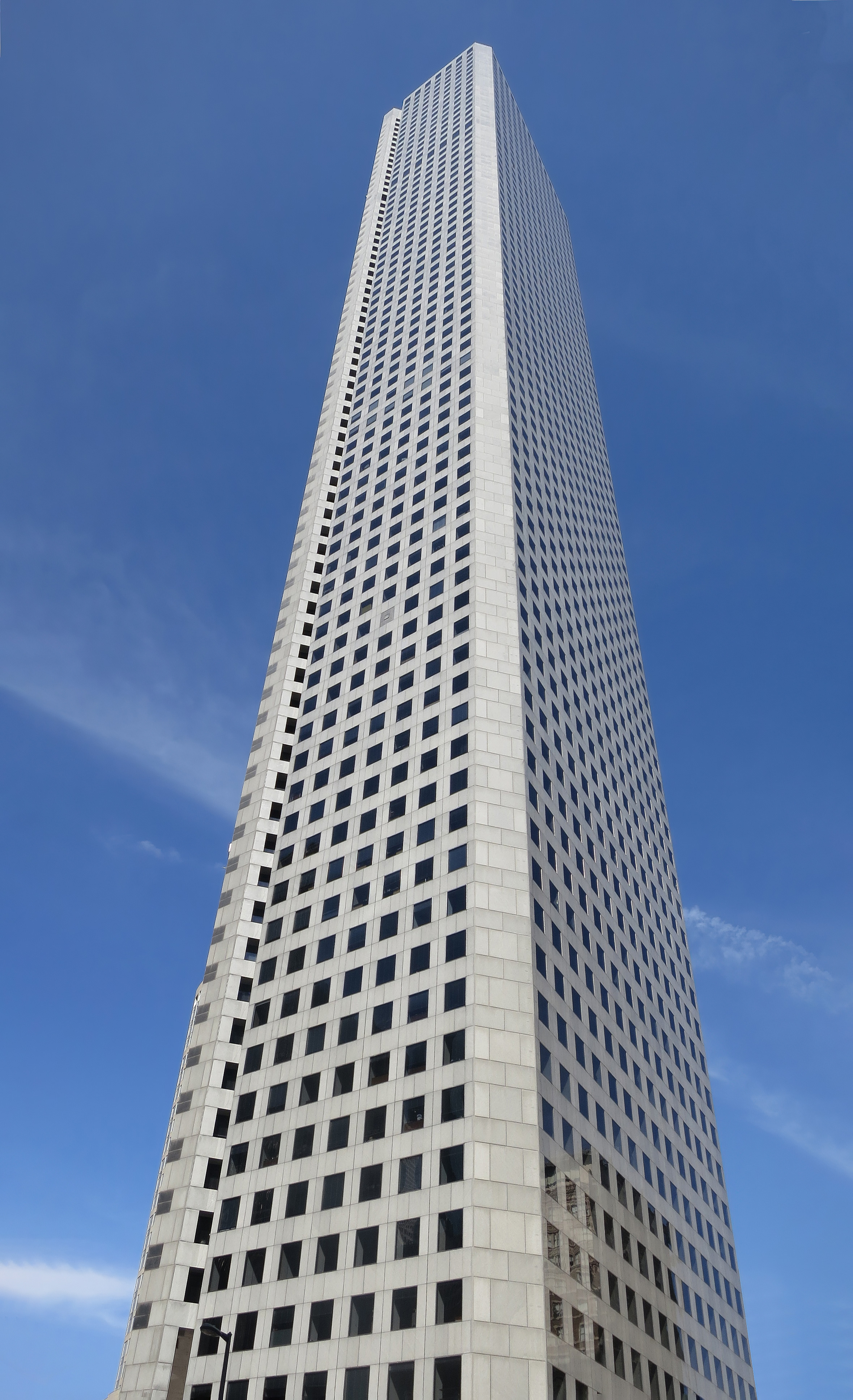
JPMorgan Chase Tower in Houston, Texas is the tallest composite building in the world

Houston's building boom of the 1970s and 1980s ceased in the mid-1980s, due to the 1980s oil glut. Building of skyscrapers resumed by 2003, but the new buildings were more modest and not as tall. During that year George Lancaster, a spokesperson for the Hines company, said "I predict the J.P. Morgan Chase Tower will be the tallest building in Houston for quite some time."

In the early 1990s many older office buildings throughout Houston remained unoccupied. At the same time newer office buildings for major corporations opened.

In 1999, the Houston-based Enron Corporation began construction of a 40-floor skyscraper. Designed by Cesar Pelli & Associates and Kendall/Heaton Associates, and completed in 2002, the building was originally known as the Enron Center. The company collapsed in a well-publicized manner in 2001, and the building became officially known by its address, 1500 Louisiana Street

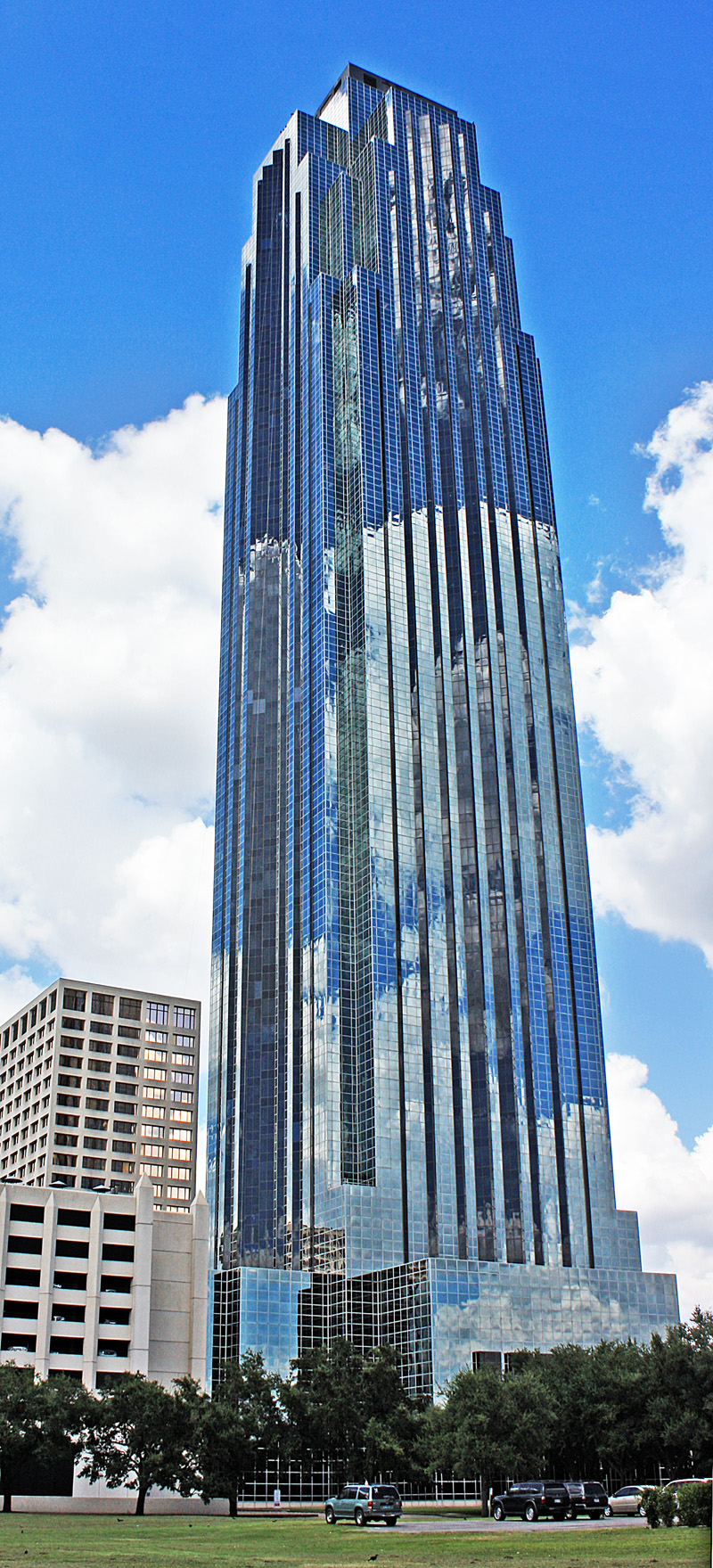
Williams Tower

One of Houston's most recent downtown landmarks is Discovery Green, a large public park designed by Page with Hargreaves Associates.

The Uptown District, located on Interstate 610 West (referred to locally as the "West Loop") between U.S. Highway 59 and Interstate 10, boomed along with Houston during the 1970s and early 1980s. During that time the area grew from farm land in the late 1960s to a collection of high-rise office buildings, residential properties, and retail establishments, including the Houston Galleria. The area is an example of what architectural theorists call the edge city. In the late 1990s Uptown Houston saw construction of many mid- and high-rise residential buildings of the tallest being about 30 stories.

The tallest structure in Uptown Houston is the 901-foot (275 m) tall, Philip Johnson-designed, landmark Williams Tower (formerly "Transco Tower"), which was constructed in 1983. At the time, it was to be the world's tallest skyscraper outside of a city's central business district. The building is topped with a rotating spot light that constantly searches the horizon. Williams Tower was named "Skyscraper of the Century" in the December 1999 issue of Texas Monthly magazine.

== Landmarks and monuments ==
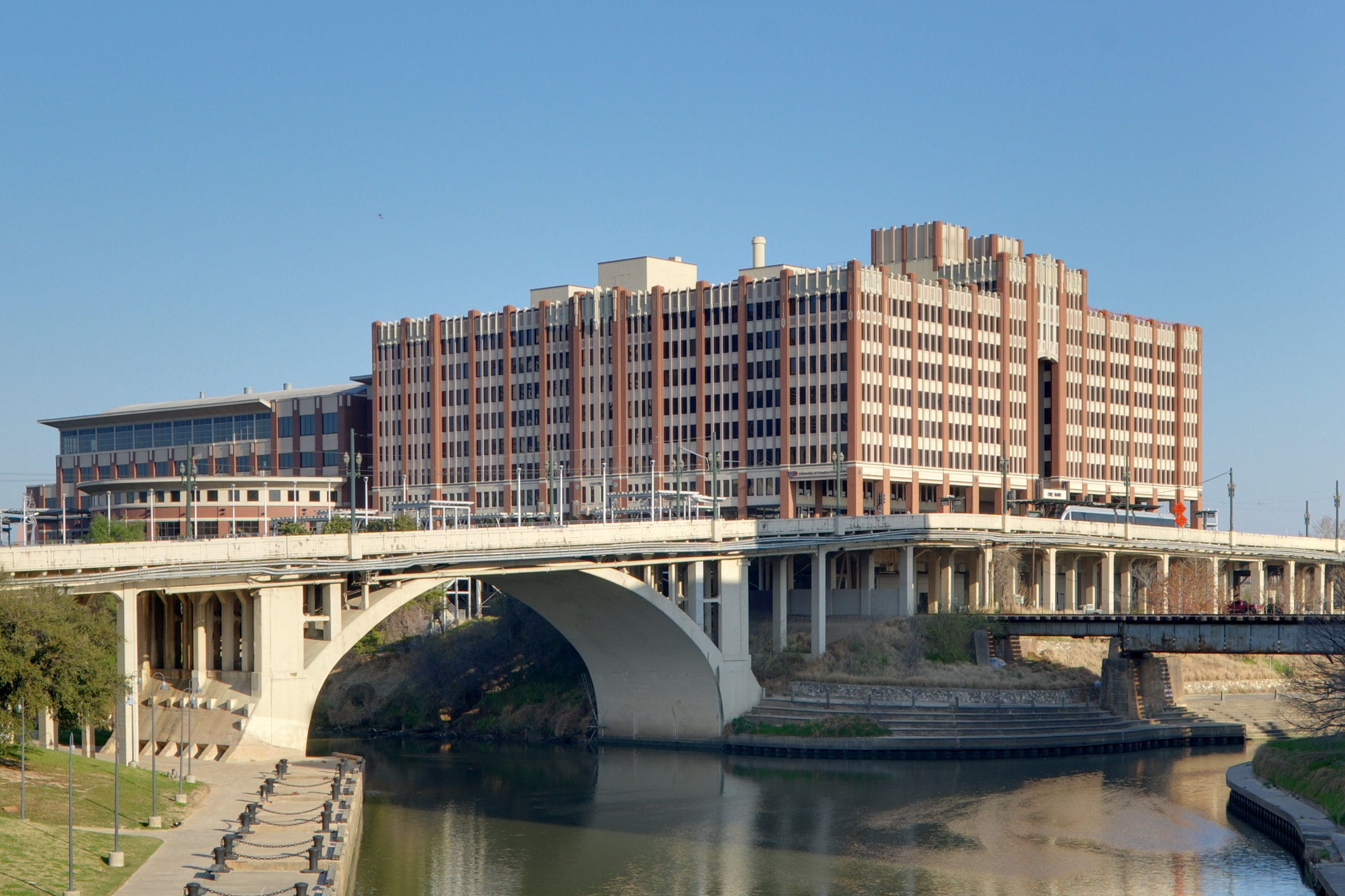
Former Merchants and Manufacturers Building on the campus of the University of Houston–Downtown

The Merchants and Manufacturers Building (M&M Building) was built in 1930 and was the largest building in Houston at the time. It featured 14 miles (23 km) of floor space and could accommodate one-third of the city's population. The Art Deco–style building is recognized as part of the National Register of Historic Places, is a Recorded Texas Historic Landmark, and considered a Contributing Building in Downtown Houston's Main Street/Market Square Historic District. Since 1974, the M&M Building has been part of the University of Houston–Downtown and was given an official designation as "One Main Building" by the university.

The historic Trinity Church in Midtown on Main Street, which dates from 1919, is a neo-Gothic structure, designed by the architectural firm, Cram and Ferguson, whose Houston work also includes several buildings at Rice University and the Julia Ideson Building of the Houston Public Library. The church's Morrow Chapel was renovated in 2002 and features stained glass, artwork, and liturgical furnishings by artists such as Kim Clark Renteria, Kermit Oliver, Troy Woods, Shazia Sikander, and Selven O’Keef Jarmon.

The Uptown District is home to structures designed by architects such as I. M. Pei, César Pelli and Philip Johnson, including Saint Martin's Episcopal Church (with spires and antennae reaching 188 feet (57 m) into the sky), which was designed by Jackson & Ryan Architects and completed in 2004. St. Martin's was featured on the covers of three national magazines: Civil Engineering (April 2005), Modern Steel Construction (May 2005) and Structure (December 2005).

The San Jacinto Monument is a 570 foot (173.7 m)-high column topped with a 220-ton star that commemorates the site of the Battle of San Jacinto, the decisive battle of the Texas Revolution. The monument, dedicated on April 21, 1939, is the world's tallest monument tower and masonry tower, and is located along the Houston Ship Channel. The column is an octagonal shaft faced with Cordova shellstone. It is the second tallest monument in the United States. The monument was designated a National Historic Landmark on December 19, 1960, and listed on the National Register of Historic Places. It was also designated an Historic Civil Engineering Landmark in 1992.

The Williams Waterwall is a multi-story sculptural fountain which sits at the south end of Williams Tower in Uptown. It and its surrounding park were built as an architectural amenity to the adjacent tower. Both the fountain and tower were designed by Pritzker Prize winning architect Philip Johnson. Completed in 1983, the semi-circular fountain is 64-foot (20 m) tall and sits among 118 Texas Live Oak trees. Approximately 11,000 gallons of water per minute cascades down vast channeled sheets on both sides from the narrower top rim of the circle to the wider base below.

=== Theater District ===
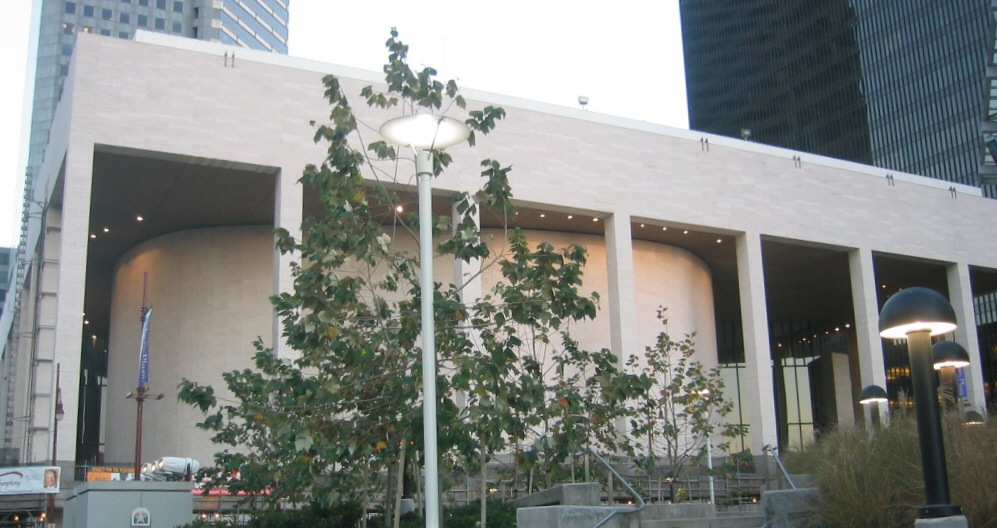
Jesse H. Jones Hall for the Performing Arts

The Jesse H. Jones Hall for the Performing Arts, commonly known as Jones Hall, is a performance venue in Houston and the permanent home of the Houston Symphony Orchestra and the Houston Society for the Performing Arts. Completed in October 1966 at the cost of $7.4 million, it was designed by the Houston-based architectural firm Caudill Rowlett Scott. The hall, which takes up a city block, has a white Italian marble exterior with eight-story tall columns. The lobby is dominated by a 60-foot (18 m) high ceiling with a massive hanging bronze sculpture by Richard Lippold entitled "Gemini II." The ceiling of the concert hall consists of 800 hexagonal segments that can be raised or lowered to change the acoustics of the hall. The building won the 1967 American Institute of Architects' Honor Award, which is bestowed on only one building annually.

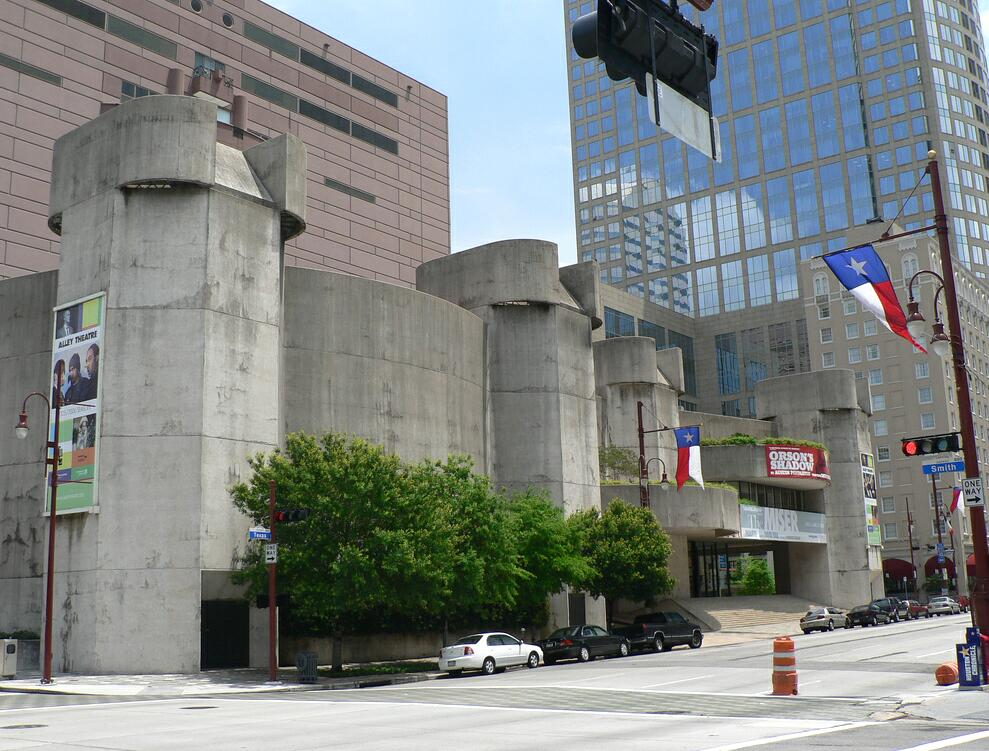
The Alley Theatre

The present Alley Theatre building opened in November 1968 and contains two stages. The main stage has 824 seats and is called the "Hubbard"; the more intimate, 310-seat stage, is the "Neuhaus." Outside, there are nine towers and open-air terraces. Inside, a staircase spirals from the entrance vestibule to the second-floor lobby. The theatre was constructed in a large part by a $1.4 million grant from the Ford Foundation to support innovative theater architecture, and the prime architect on the project was Ulrich Franzen.

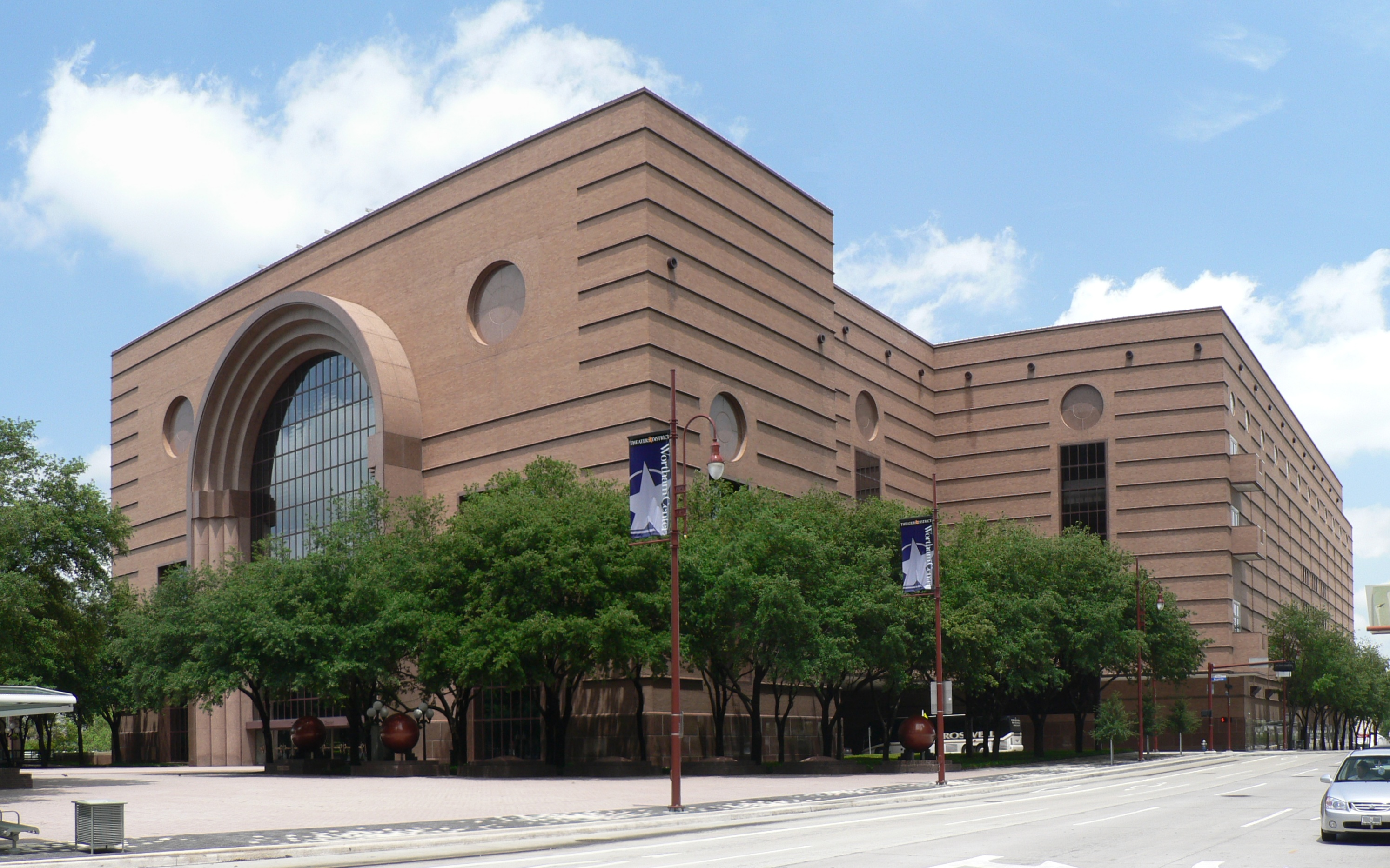
The Wortham Theater Center

The Wortham Theater Center is a performing arts center that officially opened in Houston on May 9, 1987. The Center was designed by Eugene Aubry of Morris-Aubry Architects and built entirely with $66 million in private funds. The Brown Theater, with 2,423 seats, is named for donors Alice and George Brown. It is used primarily for opera and large ballet productions. The Cullen Theater, with 1,100 seats, is named for donors Lillie and Roy Cullen. It is used for smaller ballet productions and other events. The Wortham's signature arching entryway is made of glass and stands 88 feet (27 m) tall. The grand staircase (which is actually a bank of escalators) is surrounded by a site-specific art piece created by New York sculptor Albert Paley.

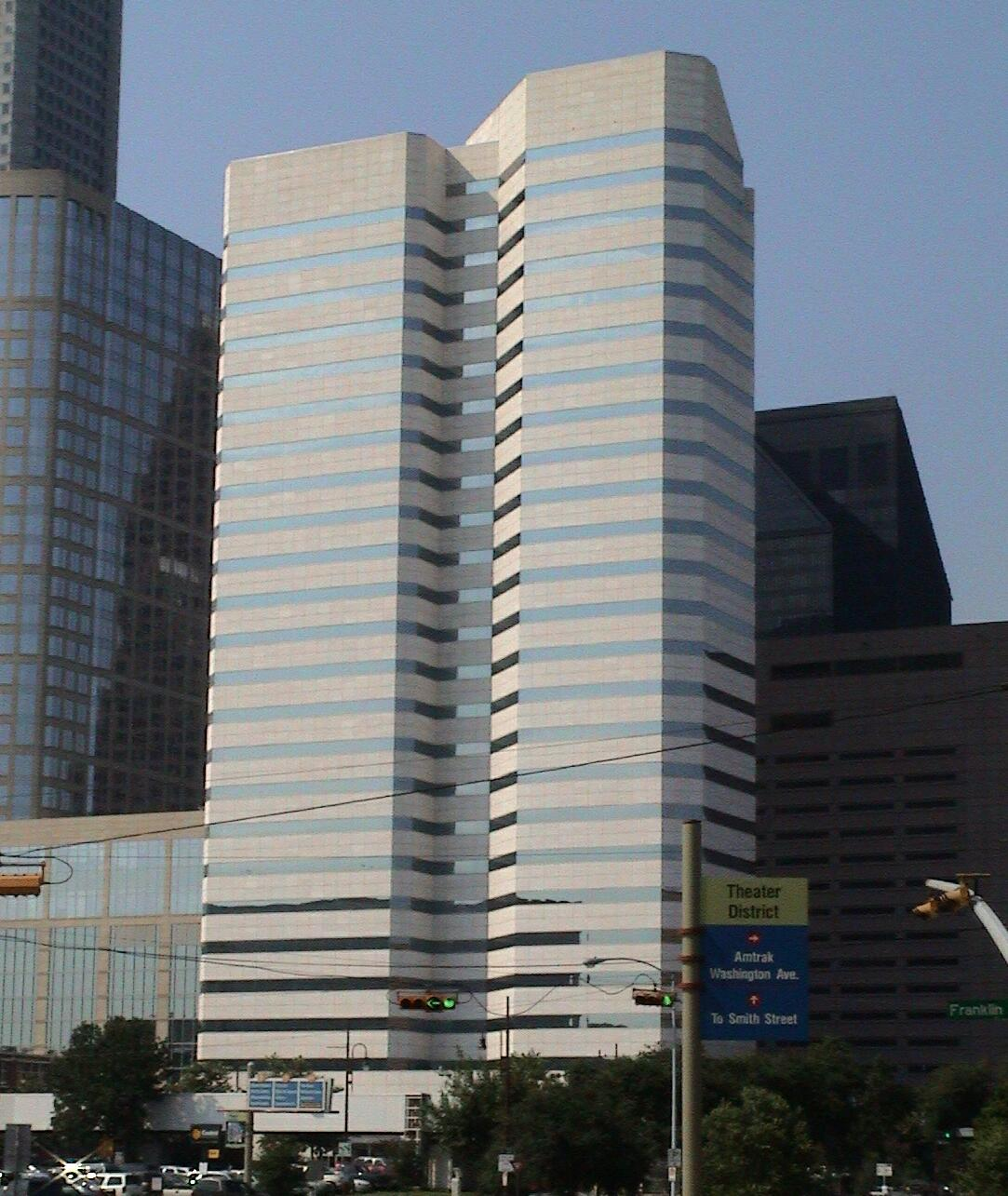
The Lyric Centre

The Lyric Centre sits in the heart of the Theater District, just across the street from the Wortham Center and adjacent to the Alley Theatre. The black-and-white striped office building houses dozens of law firms, but the block on which the tower sits is perhaps best known for the giant cellist playing outside. It is the work of sculptor David Adickes, who also created the statue of Sam Houston outside Huntsville, Texas.

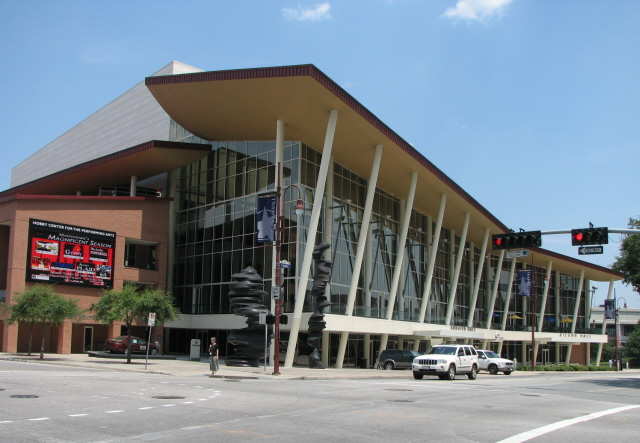
The Hobby Center

The Hobby Center for the Performing Arts is a relatively new addition to the Theatre District. It was designed by architect Robert A. M. Stern and completed in 2002, providing two theaters specifically for theater and musical performances. Sarofim Hall, a 2,600-seat theater acoustically designed for touring Broadway productions, is home to "Theatre Under the Stars." Zilkha Hall, an intimate 500-seat venue with full orchestra pit, showcases smaller touring groups.

=== Museum District ===
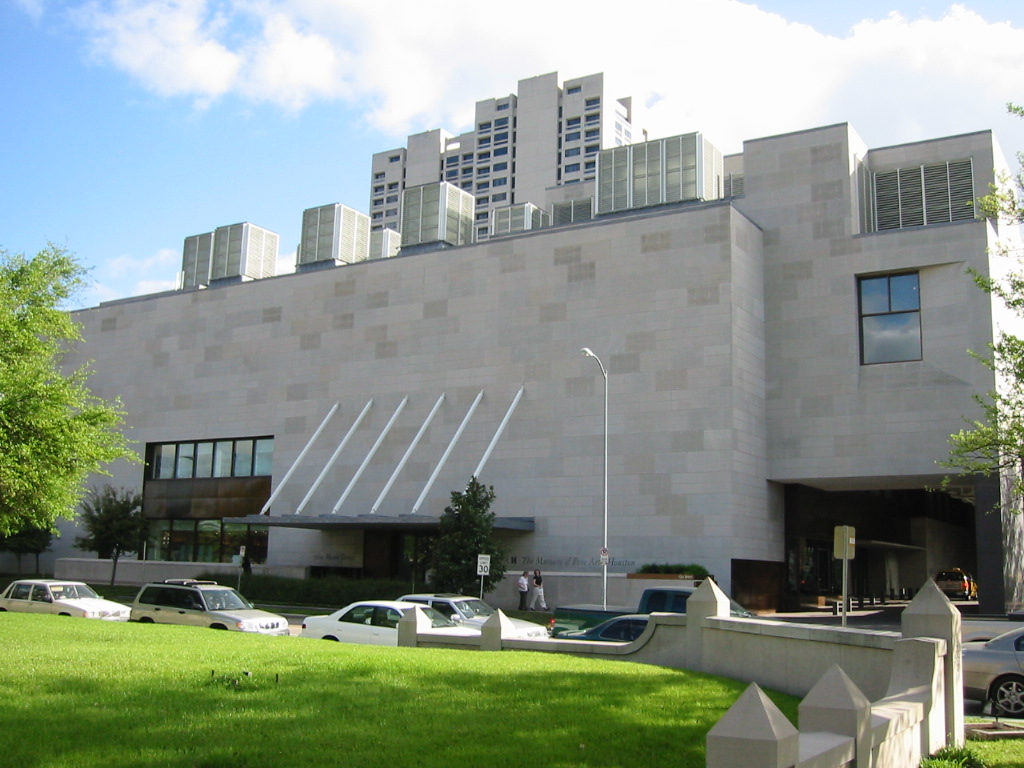
The Museum of Fine Arts

The original building of the Museum of Fine Arts, Houston, designed by William Ward Watkin, was opened in 1924. It was the first art museum built in Texas and the third in the South. The museum building has continued to evolve throughout the years. Cullinan Hall, designed by Mies van der Rohe in the International style, opened in 1958. In the 1970s, that addition received an addition, also designed by van der Rohe. Both additions were statements of modern architecture using an abundance of glass and steel.

In 1968, the present Miller Outdoor Theatre building, designed by Eugene Werlin and Associates, won several awards, including the American Iron and Steel Institute’s Biannual Award (1969), the American Institute of Steel Construction’s Award of Excellence, and the James E. Lincoln Arc Welding Foundation Award. The 1968 theatre building was refurbished starting in 1996, adding a small stage to the east end of the facility that plays to a newly incorporated open plaza area.

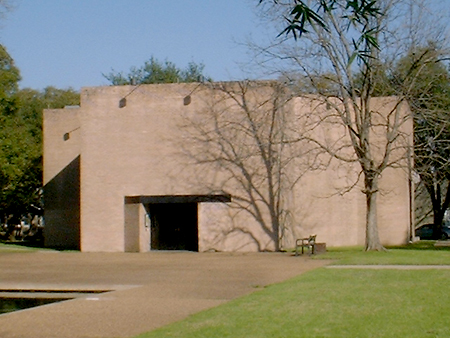
Exterior of Rothko Chapel

Also in the Museum District is the non-denominational Rothko Chapel, founded by John and Dominique de Menil, designed by Mark Rothko and Philip Johnson and completed in 1971. The interior serves not only as a chapel, but also as a major work of modern art. On its walls are 14 black but color-hued paintings by Mark Rothko, who greatly influenced the shape and design of the chapel. Rothko was given creative control, and he clashed with Philip Johnson over the plans. Rothko continued to work first with Howard Barnstone and then with Eugene Aubry, but he did not live to see the chapel's completion. In September 2000, the Rothko Chapel was placed on the National Register of Historic Places.

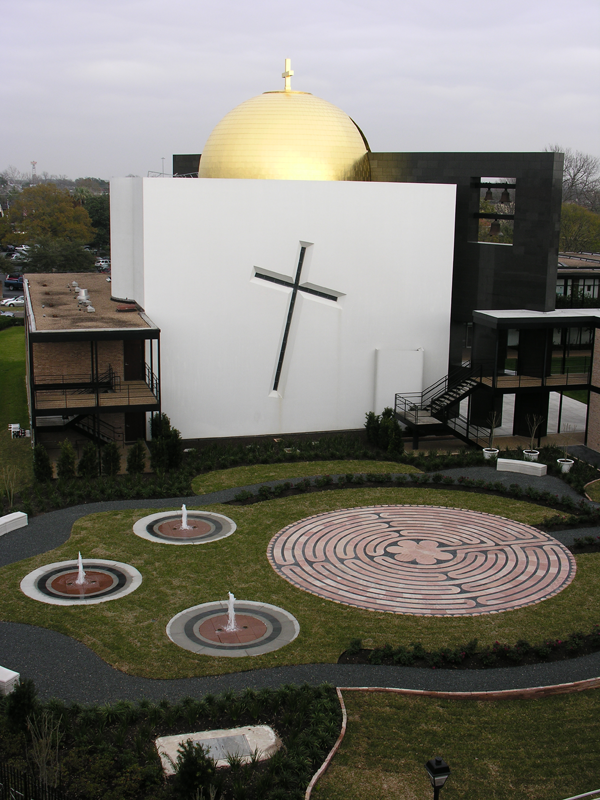
The Chapel of St. Basil

The Contemporary Arts Museum occupies a stainless-steel building in a prominent site on the corner of Montrose and Bissonnet—the heart of Houston's Museum District. The highly recognizable building was designed for the Museum by Gunnar Birkerts and opened its doors in 1972. In 1997, the museum went through its first major facility renovation in 25 years.

In addition, the Chapel of St. Basil, on the nearby campus of the University of St. Thomas, is a work of art designed by Philip Johnson that has won many awards for its architecture. The Chapel, which was built in 1997, contrasts with all of the other buildings on campus, as it is made of white stucco and black granite, rather than rose-colored brick. It is also composed of three geometric forms: the cube, the sphere, and the plane. The cube makes up the majority of the building, including the main seating area, while a golden semi-sphere dome covered with 23.5 karat gold leaf rises high above the cube. The granite plane bisects the cube and opens the chapel to light. The cube and plane interplay with the dome, creating a sense that the dome is not a cover for the Chapel, but rather an opening to the heavens.

Designed by Renzo Piano, the Menil Collection is a contemporary art museum known for its simplicity, flexibility, open spaces and illumination with natural light located in a small park surrounded by residential housing. Opening in 1986, the 402-foot (123 m)-long, two-story-high box of steel, wood and glass contains the artwork collection of John and Dominique de Menil.

== Residential architecture ==
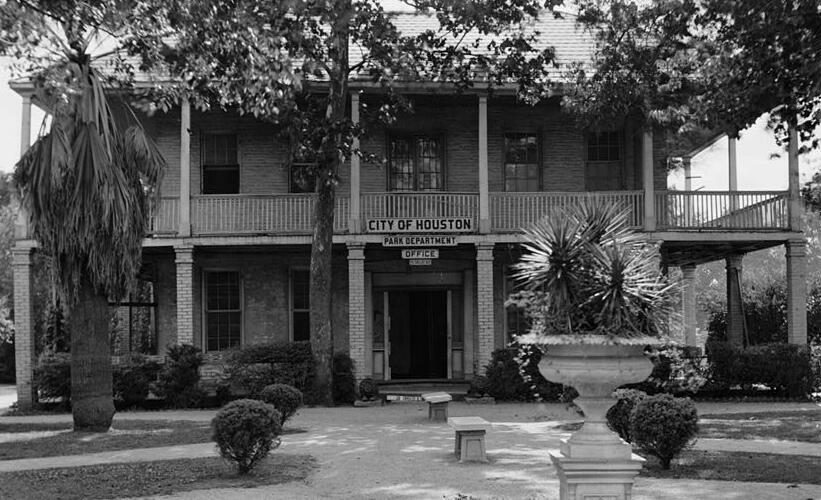
The Kellum-Noble House, in a 1936 photograph

Houston is home to various styles of residential architecture, from the mansions of New York City and Memorial to row houses in the several wards. A number of Houston's earliest homes are now located in Sam Houston Park, including the Kellum-Noble House, which was built in 1847 and is Houston's oldest brick dwelling. During the late 1930s and early 1940s, the Kellum-Noble House served as a public office for the City of Houston's Park Department, and is listed in the National Register of Historic Places.

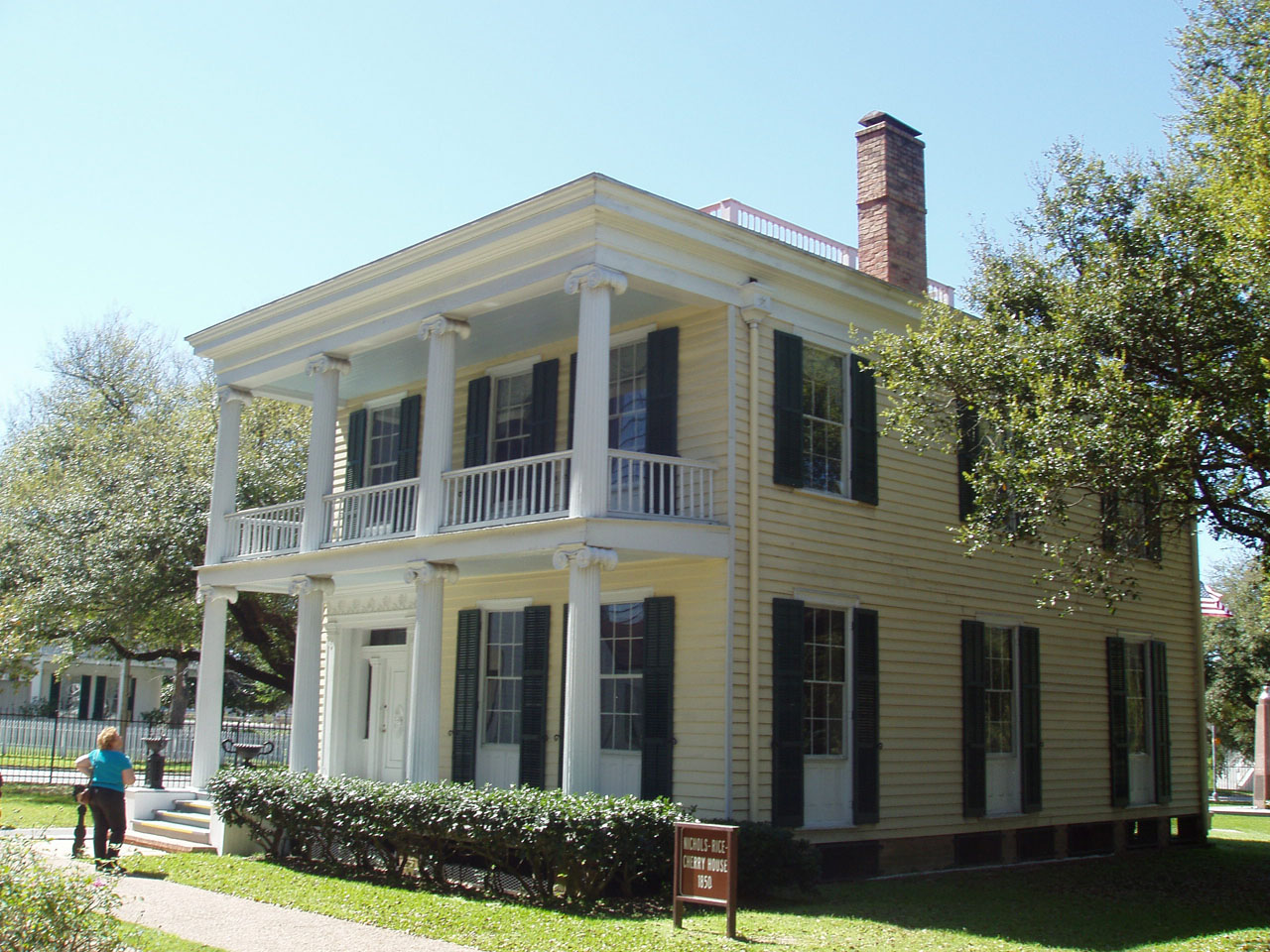
Nichols-Rice-Cherry House located in Sam Houston Park.

The Nichols-Rice-Cherry House (which was moved from San Jacinto Street) is also located in Sam Houston Park. It is an example of Greek Revival architecture and was built about 1850 by Ebeneezer B. Nichols from New York. Between 1856 and 1873 it was owned by financier William Marsh Rice, whose estate helped create Rice Institute (now Rice University) in 1912.

Homes in the Heights have varied architectural styles, including Victorian, Craftsman and Colonial Revival. The neighborhood is composed of several large homes and many smaller cottages and bungalows, many built in the late 19th and early 20th century. After 1905, Victorian cottages tended to be replaced by bungalows.

While there are a few examples in the Heights of the columned Colonial Revival, the most popular "elite" house type in the 1910 era, other upscale houses were adapted from specific historical models popular in the 1920s, such as the Shefer House with its Dutch Colonial gambrel roof and the stucco-surfaced, Mediterranean villa-type Tibbott House on Harvard Street, with French doors opening the interior of the house to its site and an east side loggia replacing the old-fashioned front porch. Since deed-restriction enforcement is mandated in the Heights area, a majority of the houses built at the start of the 20th century and early 20th century still retain the old Heights character.

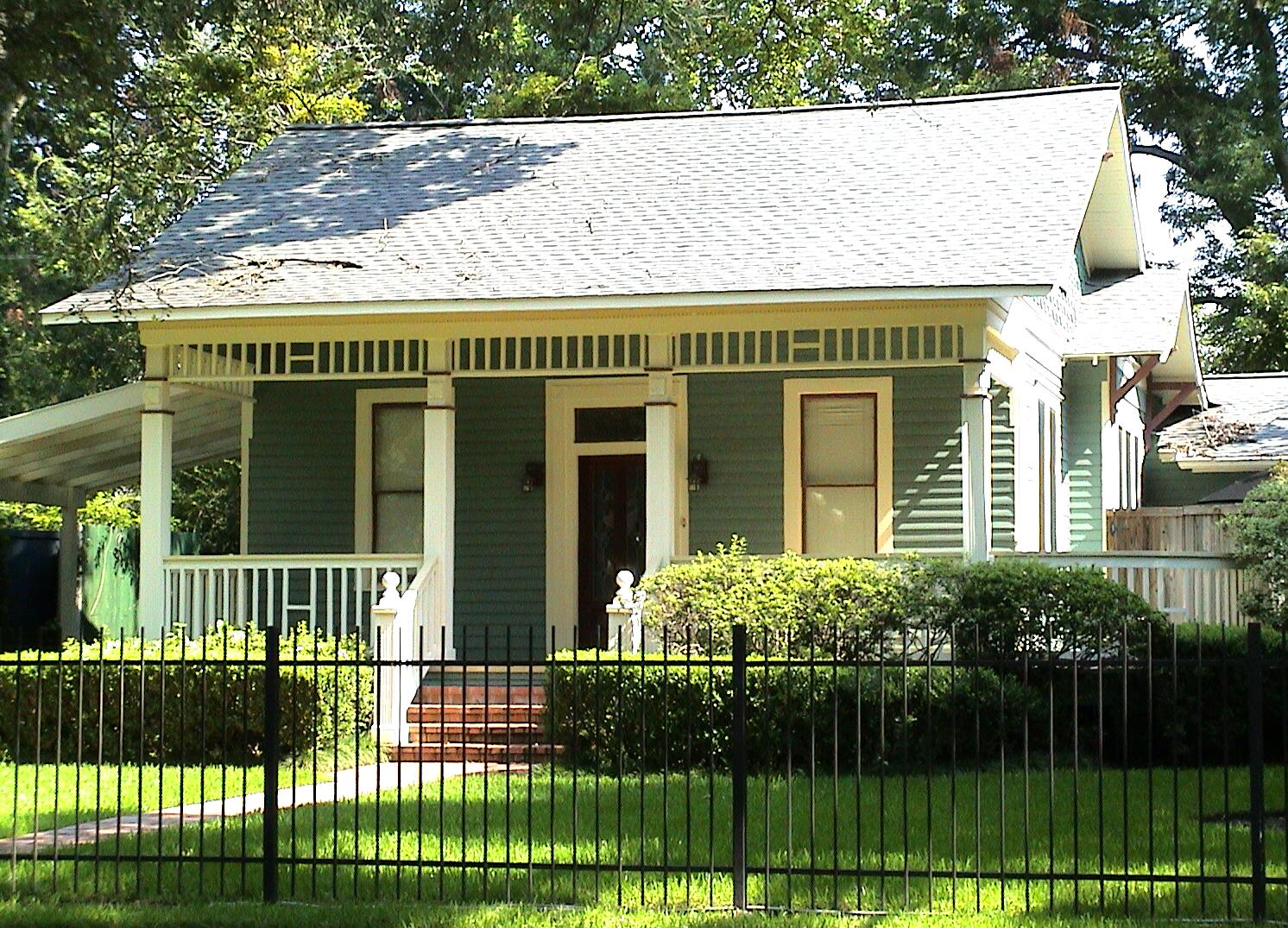
A bungalow in Houston

Many of the homes built in the Eastwood neighborhood represent Craftsman, Arts and Crafts, Foursquare and Mission Revival architectural styles. Eastwood was one of Houston’s first master-planned subdivisions. Developed in 1913 by William A. Wilson, who also developed its sister neighborhood, Woodland Heights, Eastwood has one of Houston’s largest collections of homes designed in these early-20th-century styles. In the newer section of Eastwood (built from the 1920s and 1930s), there are bungalows, prairie, colonial and federal styles.

Post-war housing constructed throughout Houston reflects many architectural styles. Although most houses built for the "baby boomers" reflect designs that had been around for decades, a number of homes were designed in the mid-century modern style, featuring flat or butterfly roofs, open floor plans, walls of glass, atriums and patios. A good example of this style is the William L. Thaxton Jr. House, located in Bunker Hill Village, which was designed by Frank Lloyd Wright and built in 1954.

Memorial Bend is made up of 1950s and early 1960s homes built in the modern (contemporary), ranch, and traditional styles. The neighborhood is considered to have the highest concentration of mid-century modern homes in Houston. Architects who designed homes in this neighborhood include William Norman Floyd, William R. Jenkins, William F. Wortham and Lars Bang. Many of the homes in Memorial Bend were featured in national architecture and design magazines like American Builder, House & Home, Practical Builder, Better Homes & Gardens and House Beautiful.

Starting in the late twentieth century, many traditional homes, townhomes and high-rise condominiums were constructed (or converted) for residents wishing to live in the downtown and inner-loop area, spurred by a focused revitalization effort after years of suburban exodus. These emerging urban dwellings can be found in an eclectic array of styles.

The Commerce Towers, originally developed as an office building in 1928 by Houston businessman Jesse H. Jones, has been converted into condominiums. In addition, many old office buildings and warehouses surrounding downtown have been recently converted to lofts. The Humble Towers Lofts, built in 1921, was originally the headquarters for Humble Oil. The Beaconsfield Lofts are registered with the US Interior Department's National Register of Historic Places.

In the late 1990s and early 2000s decade, there was a mini-boom of mid-rise and high-rise residential tower construction, with several over 30 stories tall. Since 2000 more than 30 high-rise buildings have gone up in Houston; all told, 72 high-rises tower over the city, which adds up to about 8,300 units.

== Public facilities ==
=== City and county government ===
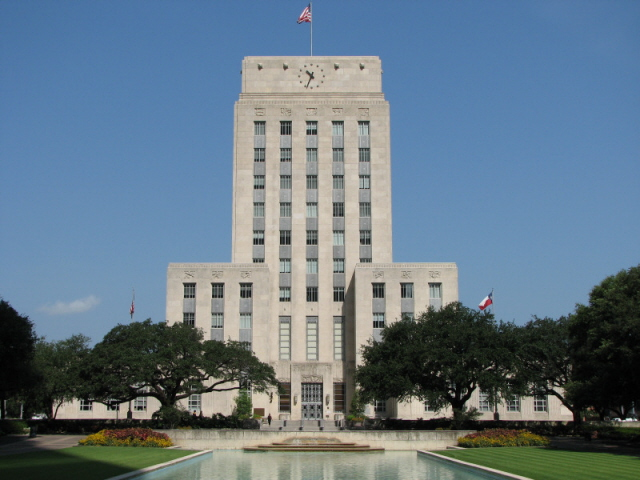
Houston City Hall

The Houston City Hall building, constructed in 1938-1939, is an example of Works Progress Administration architecture. The simply designed structure featured many construction details that have helped to make this building an architectural classic. The design on the lobby floor depicts the protective role of government. The doors feature historical figures including Thomas Jefferson, Julius Caesar, and Moses. Above the lobby entrance is a stone sculpture depicting two men taming a wild horse. The sculpture meant to symbolize a community coming together to form a government to tame the world around them. The plaster cast for this sculpture, and twenty-seven casts for friezes around the building, were done by Beaumont artist Herring Coe and co-designer Raoul Jassett.

The George R. Brown Convention Center was opened on September 26, 1987 on the east side of downtown Houston. The sleek 100 foot (30 m) high red-white-and-blue building replaced the obsolete Albert Thomas Convention Center, which was later redeveloped into the Bayou Place entertainment complex in the downtown Houston Theater District. The George R. Brown contains nearly a half-million square feet of exhibit space, 41 meeting rooms, a 3,600-seat theater area and a 31,000 square foot (2,900 m^{2}) grand ballroom.

The new Harris County Civil Courthouse, which was completed in early 2006, is 17 stories tall plus a basement. The 660,000 square foot (61,000 m^{2}) building is filled with state-of-the-art technology and has 37 typical courtrooms, 1 tax courtroom, 1 ceremonial courtroom and 6 expansion courtrooms. It also has a three-story atrium lobby with thirteen elevators and two escalators. The courthouse is flood protected to an elevation of 41 feet (12 m) and is accessible via tunnel from the existing downtown tunnel system. Interior finishes include limestone, granite, wood veneers, terrazzo and stainless steel.

=== Movie theaters ===
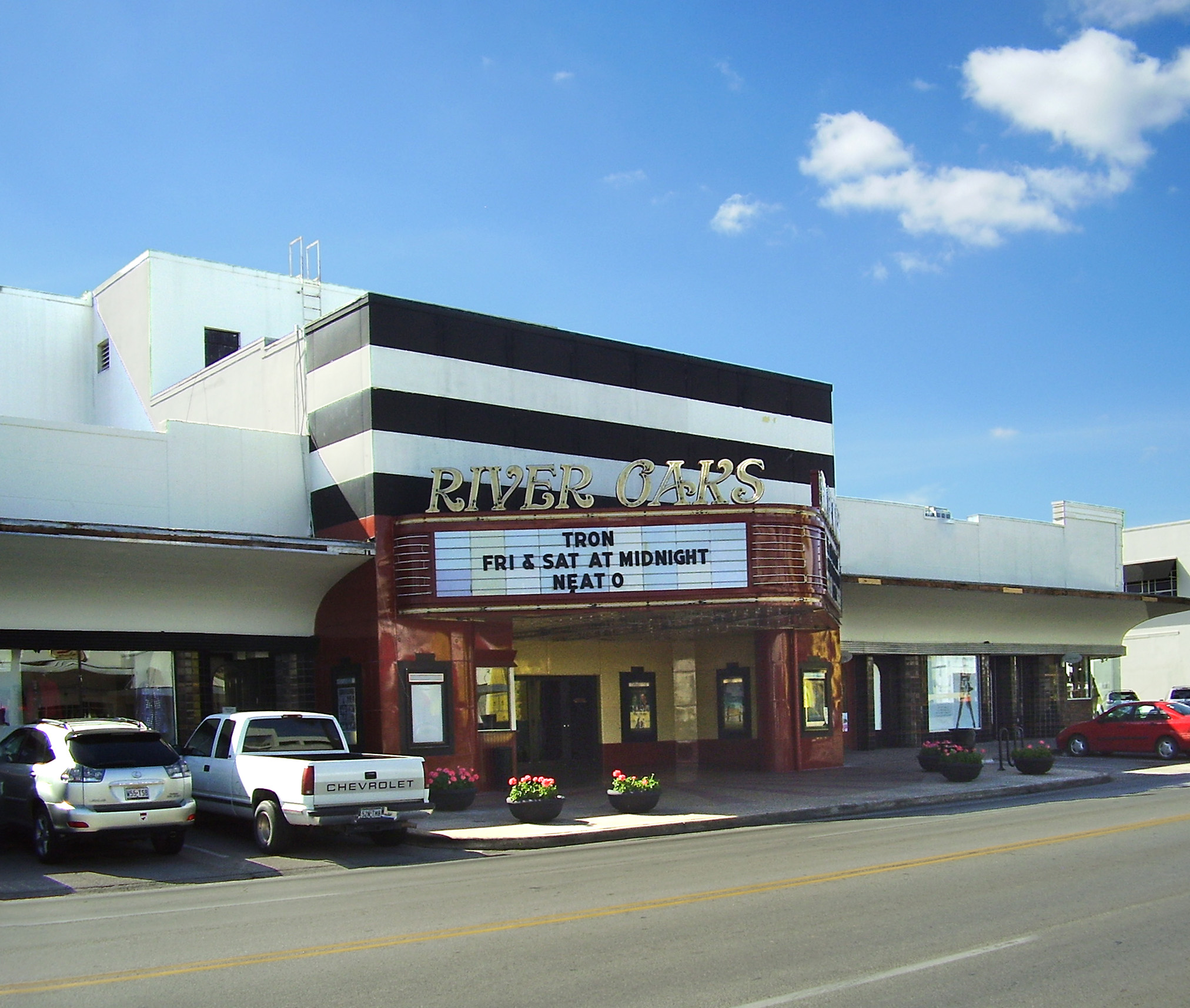
The River Oaks Theatre

The River Oaks Theatre was built in 1939. It is among only a handful of currently viable retail buildings of its age and historic style in Houston. It was the last of the deluxe neighborhood movie theaters built by Interstate Theatre Corporation and the only one of its kind still operating as a movie theater.

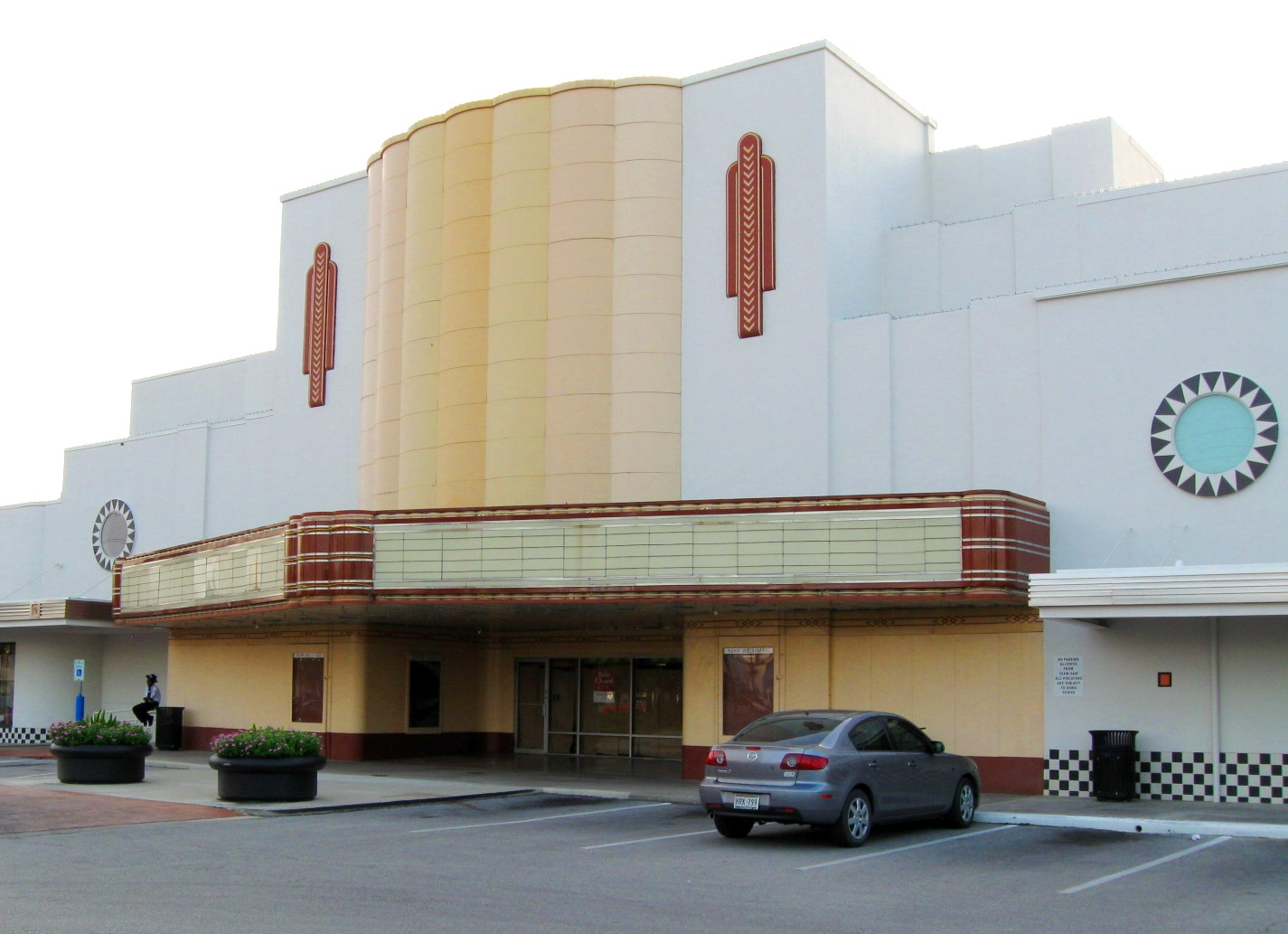
The Alabama Theatre

As Houston and the rest of the country recovered from the Great Depression, art-deco style theaters of the late 1930s were built in many residential neighborhoods across the city. In addition to the River Oaks, neighborhood movie theaters like the Alabama, Tower, Capitan, and Ritz-Majestic Metro were several of the venues where Houstonians sought entertainment. The Alabama serves as a prime example of adaptive reuse, the repurposing of architecture considered obsolete in terms of modern usage. Opening as a Bookstop bookstore in 1984 after the original theater closed, the building was later converted into Houston's first Trader Joe's specialty grocery store in 2012. The grocer took pains to preserve much of the building's original architectural splendor, including its original terrazzo-tile front entrance as well as its second-floor balcony.

The Majestic Theater, designed by John Eberson and constructed downtown in 1923, is considered to be the most notable movie theatre built in the city. The design was not of a standard theatre interior, but an outdoor plaza and garden with a starlit sky overhead. The Mediterranean blue ceiling, inset with twinkling lights, featured clouds that floated over the heads of the audience during screenings. The Majestic was the world’s first “atmospheric” movie theatre.

=== Airports ===
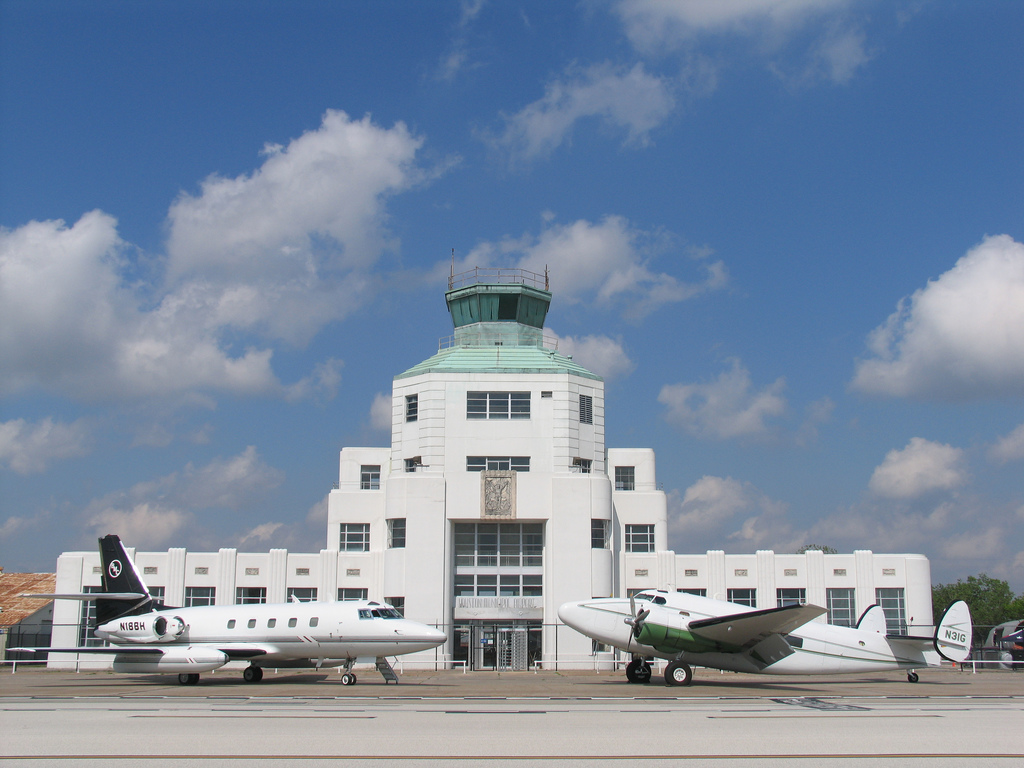
The 1940 Municipal Airport Terminal at William P. Hobby Airport

Designed by architect Joseph Finger (who also designed Houston's City Hall), the Houston Municipal Airport Terminal was constructed in 1940 to meet Houston's growing role as a center for air commerce in the 1930s. The terminal building is an example of classic art deco airport architecture from the 1940s. The terminal served as the primary commercial air terminal for Houston until 1954. The terminal, located at William P. Hobby Airport, houses the 1940 Air Terminal Museum which currently exhibits several collections focusing on Houston's aviation history.

=== Stadia ===
The 70,000-seat Rice Stadium, designed in 1950 by Hermon Lloyd & W.B. Morgan and Milton McGinty, is of reinforced concrete with 30-inch (760 mm) diameter columns supporting the upper decks. Architecturally, the stadium is an example of modernism, with simple lines and an unadorned, functional design. The entire lower seating bowl is located below the surrounding ground level. Intended solely for football games, the stadium has excellent sightlines from almost every seat.

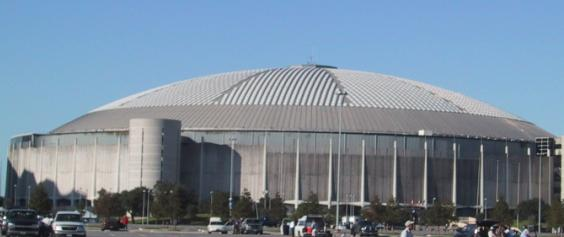
The Astrodome

The Astrodome, the world's first domed stadium, was conceived by Roy Hofheinz and designed by architects Hermon Lloyd & W.B. Morgan, and Wilson, Morris, Crain and Anderson. Structural engineering and structural design was performed by Walter P Moore Engineers and Consultants of Houston. It stands 18 stories tall, covering 9½ acres. The stadium is 710 feet (220 m) in diameter and the ceiling is 208 feet (63 m) above the playing surface, which itself sits 25 feet (7.6 m) below street level. Despite innovations necessitated by the novelty of the design (including the modest flattening of the supposed "hemispherical roof" to deal with environmentally induced structural deformation and the use of a new paving process called "lime stabilization" to deal with soil consistency issues and facilitate paving) the Astrodome was completed in November 1964, six months ahead of schedule.

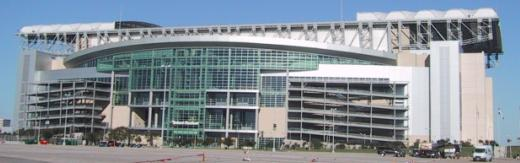
NRG Stadium

Located near the Astrodome, NRG Stadium is a wonder of modern sports facility design and engineering. The 69,500-seat stadium has a natural grass playing field and a retractable roof—a first for the NFL. There are also 165 private suites, 8,200 club seats, and more than 400 concession and novelty stands. The playing field is palletized and removable, allowing for the addition of a significant layer of dirt to accommodate the annual Houston Livestock Show and Rodeo, or use the concrete floor for concerts, trade shows, and conventions.

== See also ==
- Architectural style
- List of tallest buildings in Texas
- Skyscraper
- Urban planning
