= Indeed Tower =

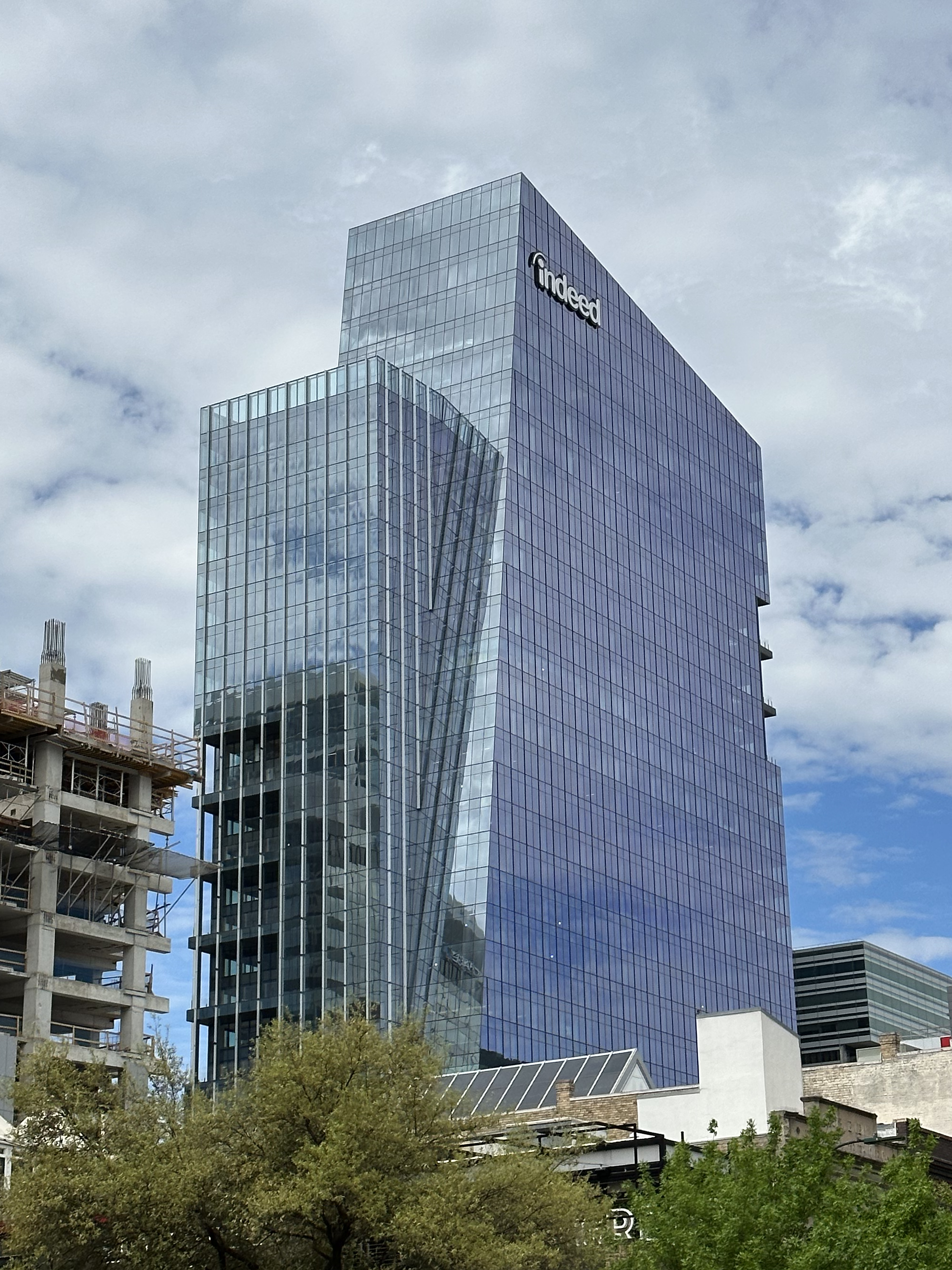
- Alternative names: Block 71

General information
- Type: Office
- Location: 200 W. Sixth St., Austin
- Coordinates: 30.26874°N 97.74461°W
- Groundbreaking: May 18, 2018
- Estimated completion: March 2021

Height
- Height: 542 ft (165 m)

Technical details
- Floor count: 36
- Floor area: 709,000 sq ft (65,900 m^{2})

Design and construction
- Architect: Larry Speck
- Architecture firm: Page (firm)
- Developer: Trammell Crow

Website
- www.indeedtower.com

Indeed Tower is a 542 foot office skyscraper located at 200 West Sixth Street in Downtown Austin, Texas. It's a 683,000-square-foot Class AA office tower with two rooftop terraces and ground floor retail, a historic 1914 post office repurposed as a 25,000 square-foot retail and restaurant destination, and a 20,000 square-foot urban greenspace. There are five levels of underground parking and 12 floors of above-ground parking as part of the structure.

== History ==
Block 71 was a 1.75-acre downtown site owned by the University of Texas and bordered by West Seventh, Colorado, West Sixth and Lavaca Streets. It contained Claudia Taylor Johnson Hall, which was built as a post office in 1914 and later converted to university office space. The building was renamed for President Lyndon B. Johnson's wife in 1970. The nine-story Ashbel Smith Hall was constructed on the site in 1974 as administrative offices for the University of Texas System. Ashbel Smith Hall was replaced by a new UT System Headquarters Building at 210 West Seventh Street, and was then demolished in the largest implosion in Austin history on March 25, 2018.

Beginning in 2015, the University of Texas sought plans from developers for a new office tower on the Block 71 site and decided on Trammell Crow Company. Trammell Crow and architect Page came up with a design for a new 36-story office tower and complex that integrates the historic Claudia Taylor Johnson Hall. The glass street-level design on the south side of the tower is intended to maximize views of the former post office from all angles, with a large setback that doesn't obscure the original building. The two structures are connected through the post office's former loading dock on its eastern side, leading into the office tower's large open lobby.

On May 17, 2018, Indeed announced that it had signed a lease to occupy the top 10 floors as part of its plan to hire an additional 3,000 employees in Austin. It was later announced that Indeed had purchased the naming rights to the building, giving it the official name of Indeed Tower instead of Block 71.

Construction of the Indeed Tower concluded in May 2021 and was purchased by Kilroy Realty on June 16, 2021, for $580 million.
