= Larry Speck =

American architect

Lawrence Speck
- Education: Massachusetts Institute of Technology
- Occupations: Principal of Page, Professor at the University of Texas at Austin
- Board member of: Texas Society of Architecture

Lawrence Speck is an American architect and professor. He is a senior principal with Page architects and a professor at the University of Texas at Austin, where he holds the W. L. Moody Centennial Professorship in Architecture. He is one of the former presidents of the Texas Society of Architecture. He was a dean of the School of Architecture at the University of Texas at Austin from 1992 to 2001 and served as the founding director of the Center of American Architecture and Design from 1982 to 1990. He attended the Massachusetts Institute of Technology (M.I.T.), receiving bachelor's degrees in design and management, as well as a Master degree in Architecture.

== Writings ==
Speck is the author of over 50 publications focusing primarily on twentieth-century American architecture and urbanism. He has written 2 complete books, "Technology, Sustainability, and Cultural Identity" (2007) and "Landmarks of Texas Architecture" (1986), co-authored another, "The University of Texas at Austin (The Campus Guide)" (2011) and edited and contributed chapters to several others. He also wrote and hosted the PBS documentary, "Building the American City: San Antonio". Speck joined the University of Texas at Austin faculty in 1975 and currently teaches an entry level undergraduate course, "Architecture and Society", a graduate seminar on "Theory and Practice", and Advanced Design. Some teaching awards include: UT Most Interesting Professor Award (2008), Regents’ Outstanding Teaching Award (2009), and Edward J. Dominic Award, given by Texas Society of Architects to outstanding architectural educator (2005). Previously, he taught "Architectural Design Theory" and "Criticism of Architecture" at M.I.T.

== Designs ==
Speck was the lead designer for the Austin Convention Center completed in 1992, the Austin-Bergstrom International Airport completed in 1998 and Rough Creek Lodge completed in 1999 and contributed to the Town Lake Master Plan, which shapes development in downtown Austin. In 1999 Speck joined Page Southerland Page where he is now one of five principals. Page Southerland Page has offices in Houston, Denver, Dallas, Austin and Washington, D.C. Over the last 25 years, his design work has won 42 national design awards, 23 state or regional design awards and 66 local design awards.

He has also served on advisory boards for two U.S. governmental agencies (U. S. State Department Overseas Building Operations and U. S. General Services Administration Design Excellence Program), two national environmental non-profits (Green guard Environmental Institute and Air Quality Sciences) and five schools of architecture (M.I.T., University of Michigan, Tulane University, Louisiana State University, University of Nevada, Las Vegas).

Larry Speck lives and works in Austin, Texas.

== List of major works ==
- Campus Services Building, University of Texas, Dallas, Texas
- East Avenue Mixed-Use Development, Austin, Texas
- U.S. Federal Courthouse, Alpine, Texas
- Chickasaw Health Center, Ada, Oklahoma
- Discovery Green Park, Houston, Texas
- The Grove Restaurant, Houston, Texas
- Kaminsky House, Dallas, Texas
- AMLI on Second Residential Tower, Austin, Texas
- Waterstone Condominiums, Lake Travis, Texas
- Herrmann House, Santa Fe, New Mexico
- Christ Church Cathedral Expansion, Houston, Texas
- Prothro House, Dallas, Texas
- FBI Regional Headquarters, Houston, Texas
- Seton Medical Center Expansion, Austin, Texas
- Austin City Lofts
- Wabash Garage, Austin, Texas
- Driskill Children's Clinic, McAllen, Texas
- Computer Science Corporation Offices, Austin, Texas
- Barbara Jordan Terminal, Austin Bergstrom International Airport
- Robert E. Johnson State Office Building, Austin, Texas
- The Terrace” Office Complex, Austin, Texas
- Rough Creek Lodge, Glen Rose, Texas
- Intermedics Orthopedics Corporate Headquarters, Austin, Texas
- Jones House, Austin, Texas
- House for a Single Woman, Austin, Texas
- Salado Town Hall, Salado, Texas
- Austin Convention Center
- Umlauf Sculpture Garden, Austin, Texas
- House on Sunny Slope, Austin, Texas
- Town Lake Comprehensive Plan, Austin, Texas
- Houston Street Transit Project, San Antonio, Texas
- Ross House, Lake Travis, Texas
- Salado Historic Town Plan
- Airy Mount, Burnet, Texas
- Tapp Ranch House, Wimberley, Texas
- Lemann-Browning House, Austin, Texas
- Lakeside House, Austin, Texas
- Lehman Library, Lake Travis, Texas
- The Tuscany Apartments, Austin, Texas
- Town Center (City Hall, Police/Fire Station, Recreation Center), Burnet, Texas
- The Bailey Estate (8 houses), Austin, Texas
- Matthews Ranch House, Burnet County, Texas
- Cable Library, West Lake Hills, Texas
- Proposed Housing for the Elderly, Fitchburg, Massachusetts
