= Memorial Bend, Houston =

Neighborhood in Houston, Texas

Memorial Bend is a historic neighborhood on the west side of Houston, Texas.

It is made up of 1950s and early 1960s homes built in the modern (contemporary), ranch, and traditional styles. Memorial Bend is considered to have the highest concentration of mid-century modern homes in Houston. Modern architects who designed homes in this neighborhood include: William Norman Floyd, William R. Jenkins, William F. Wortham and Lars Bang. Many of these homes were featured in national magazines for architecture and design such as American Builder, House & Home, Practical Builder, Better Homes & Gardens and House Beautiful.

Memorial Bend is located in the 77024 zip code area just south of Memorial Drive and straddles the Sam Houston Tollway (built through the middle of the neighborhood in 1992). Memorial Bend is within the Spring Branch Independent School District (SBISD). The schools zoned to Memorial Bend are Rummel Creek Elementary, Memorial Middle, and Memorial and Stratford Highs.
