= Bayou Place =

Entertainment complex in Houston, Texas

Coordinates: 29.762147°N 95.367176°W

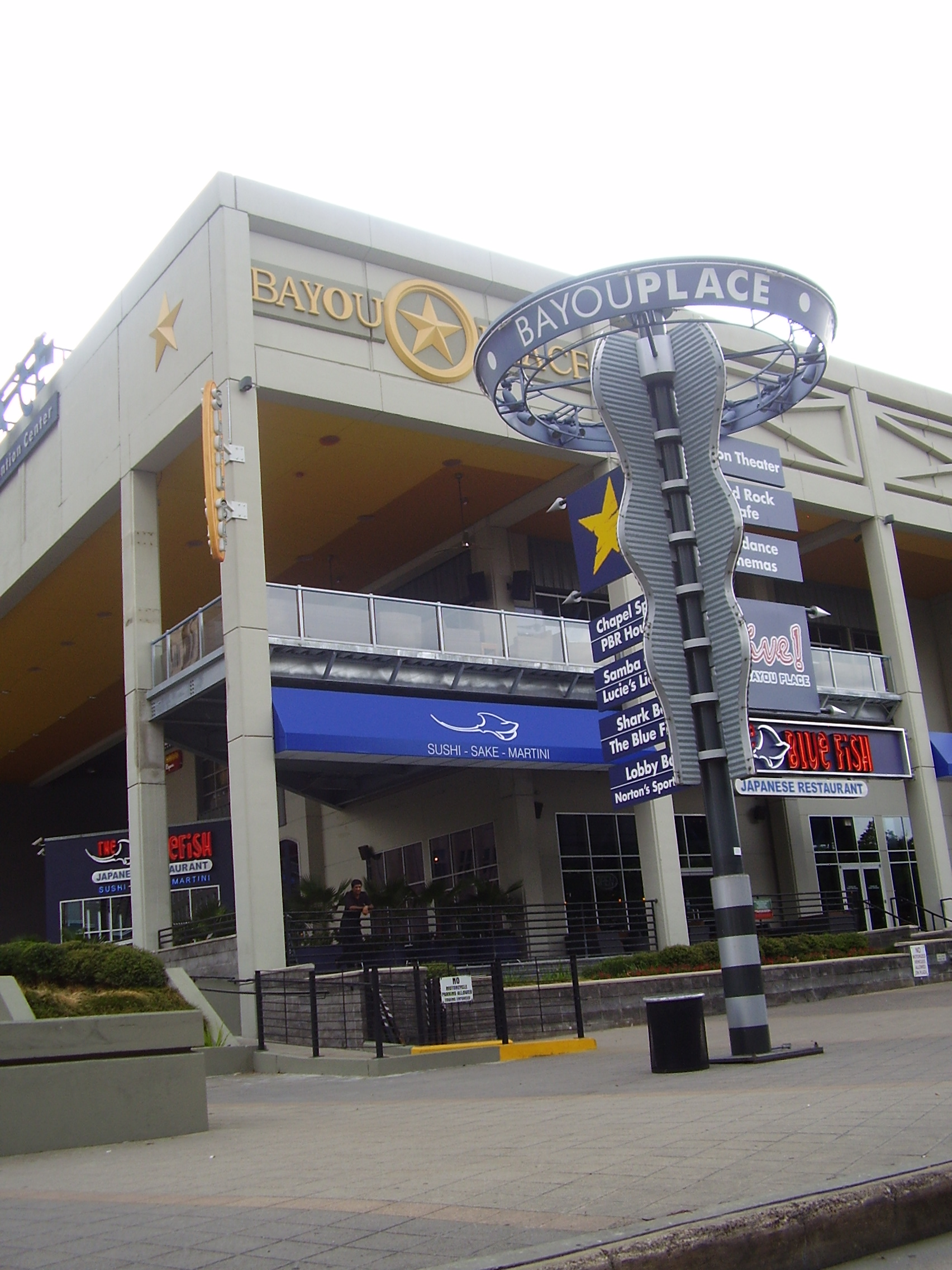
Bayou Place

Bayou Place is a 130,000 square foot entertainment complex that houses multiple theaters, bars, and restaurants located in Downtown Houston, Texas, United States. The complex was the former Albert Thomas convention center located in the Houston Theater District at 500 Texas Street (originally built in the late 1960s).

The convention center was made obsolete with the opening in 1987 of the much larger George R. Brown Convention Center on the eastern edge of downtown. After years of discussion (which included possibly turning the building into offices, or demolishing it altogether), Maryland-based developer David Cordish entered into an agreement with the city of Houston in 1991 to redevelop the site. After a few more years of discussions, delays, and construction, it was reopened to the public as an entertainment complex December 31 (New Year's Eve), 1997. At one time the complex had a scheduled completion date in the year 1996.

The Cordish Companies has had a 50-year lease to manage Bayou Place since 1997.

== Dining and entertainment ==
The following are located within the complex:

- Bayou Music Center – a versatile theater that can be arranged in a variety of seating configurations: Theater style with rows of chairs (capacity 2400); cabaret style with cocktail tables for four (capacity 1930); general admission - standing (capacity 2,815); banquet style with 72' round tables of 10 (capacity 750). A four-tiered riser system on the main floor creates an intimate cabaret/dinner theater feel. The permanent 56' x 40' stage is equipped with ample sound and light. Two 8' x 10' video screens are suspended above the stage. Check the Website for upcoming concert schedules.
- AMC Houston 8 (formerly Sundance Cinemas Houston) opened in Bayou Place in early November 2011. The theater features specialized film programming and also present features from film festivals and from general release. In March 2011, Cordish signed a 10-year lease with Sundance. The 36,000 square feet (3,300 m^{2}) space will receive a $2.25 million remodeling. It opened to the public on November 23, 2011. On November 21 and 22, four pre-opening benefit events will be held by the Museum of Fine Arts Houston, the Houston Cinema Society, the Montrose Counseling Center, and the Galveston Bay Foundation.
  - The space was originally held by Angelika Film Center. The theater closed after being open for 13 years. Angelika left the space and closed on Sunday, August 29, 2010 due to a dispute with the landlord.
