= Houston Theater District =

Neighborhood in Texas, United States

Theater District
- Neighborhood
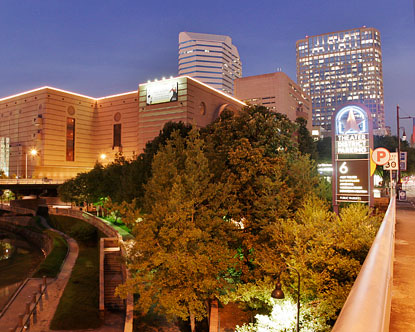
- Marker indicating the Theater district

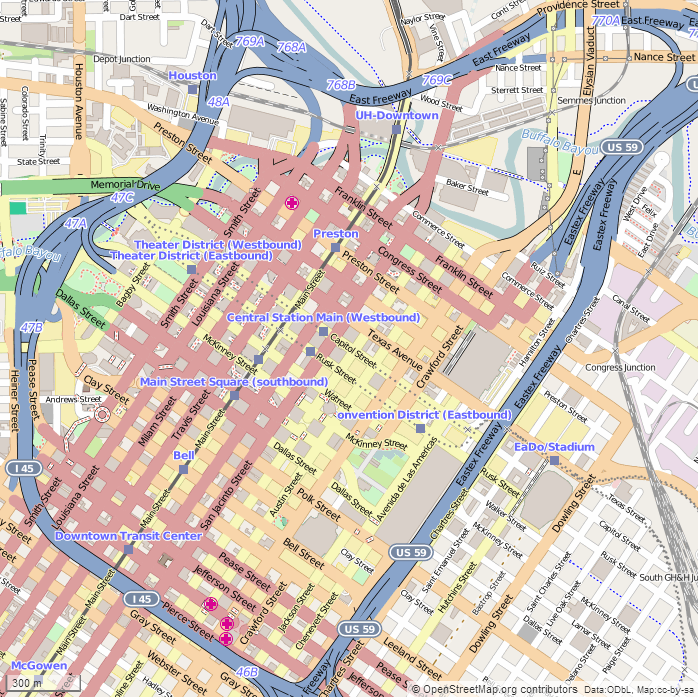
- Location within Downtown Houston
- Coordinates: 29°45′43″N 95°21′58″W
- Country: United States
- State: Texas
- County: Harris County
- City: Houston
- ZIP Code: 77002
- Area code: 713
- Website: www.houstontheaterdistrict.org

The Houston Theater District, a 17-block area in the heart of Downtown Houston, Texas, United States, is home to Houston's nine professional performing arts organizations, the 130,000-square-foot (12,000 m^{2}) Bayou Place entertainment complex, restaurants, movies, plazas, and parks. More than two million people visit the Houston Theater District annually.

== Rankings and recognition ==
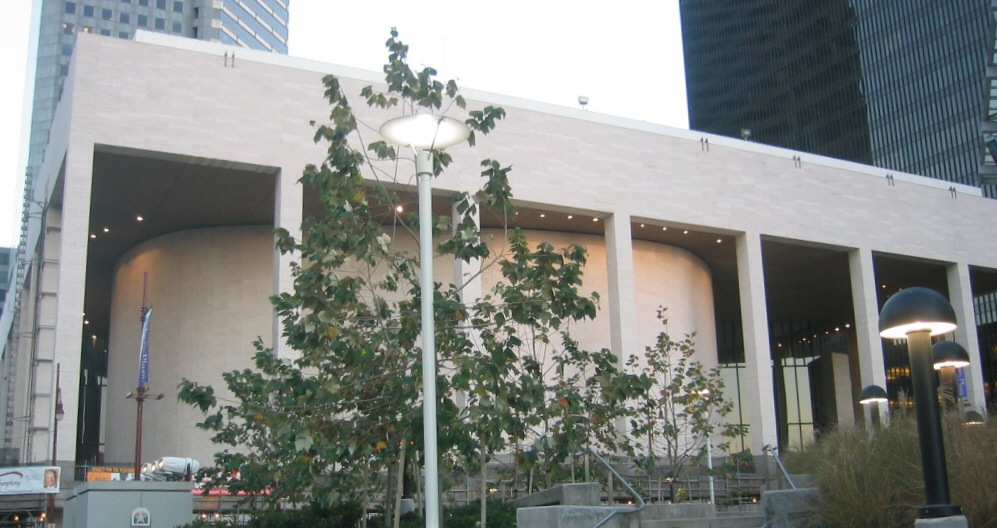
Jesse H. Jones Hall

The district, with 19,341 seats for live performances and 1,580 movie seats and is one of only five American cities with permanent professional resident companies in all of the major performing arts disciplines: the Houston Grand Opera, the Houston Symphony Orchestra, the Houston Ballet, Theatre Under the Stars and The Alley Theatre.

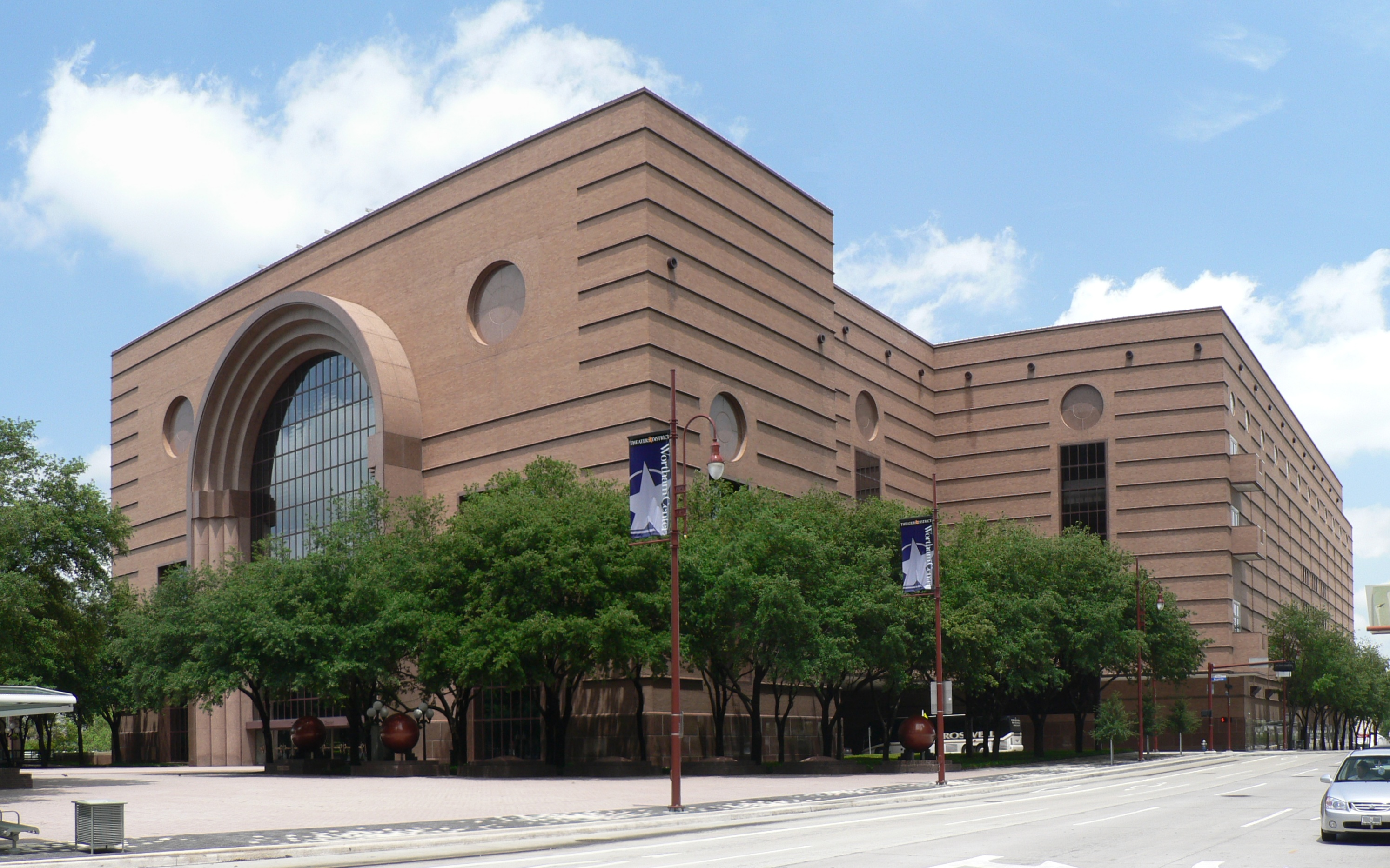
The Wortham Theater Center

Houston is recognized as an important city for contemporary visual arts. The city is a prime stop for touring companies from Broadway; concerts and shows, from The Rolling Stones to Cirque du Soleil; and exhibitions for a variety of interests, ranging from the nation's largest quilting show to auto, boat, and home shows.

The Houston Grand Opera is the only opera company in the U.S. to win a Grammy, a Tony, and an Emmy. In 2007, Da Camera of Houston was awarded the CMAcclaim Award from Chamber Music America, for significant contribution to the cultural life of its region.

The Tony Award winning Alley Theatre, founded in 1947, is Texas' oldest professional theatre company. The Alley is the third oldest continually operating theatre in the United States. It is considered to be one of the foremost theatre companies in the United States outside of New York City and was a pioneering company of the regional theatre movement.

== Venues ==
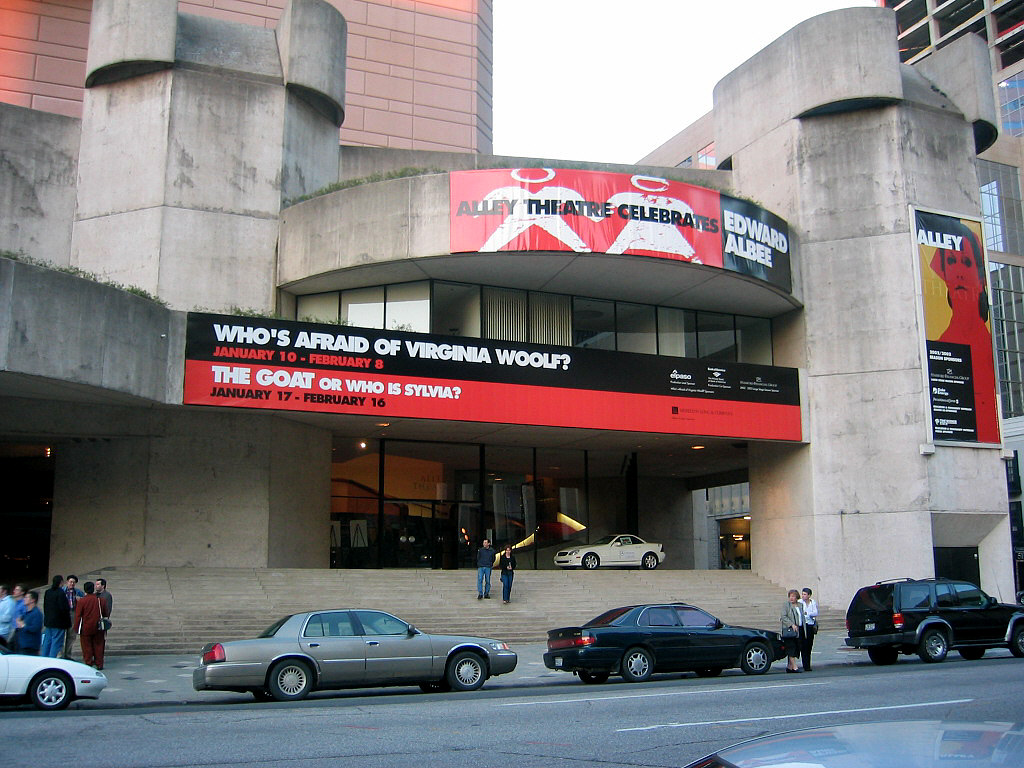
The Alley Theatre

- Alley Theatre
  - Hubbard Stage
  - Neuhaus Stage
- Hobby Center for the Performing Arts
  - Sarofim Hall
  - Zilkha Hall
- Jones Hall
- Bayou Place
- Wortham Theater Center
  - Brown Theater
  - Cullen Theater

== Attractions ==
One of the several attractions in the district is the Bayou Place Entertainment Complex—a large multilevel building that is home to full-service restaurants, bars, live music, billiards, multiple theaters, and art house films. The Revention Music Center - Formerly Houston Bayou Music Center and the Verizon Wireless Theatre- stages a variety of live concerts, and the [Sundance Theatre - Formerly the Angelika Theatre] presents the latest in art, foreign, and independent films.

== History ==
Early venues in the district were the Sam Houston Coliseum and the Houston Music Hall.

== Parks ==
Jones Plaza is in the district; it will be renamed Lynn Wyatt Square For The Performing Arts after Lynn Wyatt, in 2019, gave $10 million for a renovation.

== Transportation ==
The district is served by METRORail light rail service at Theater District Station.
