= Page (firm) =

Architectural firm

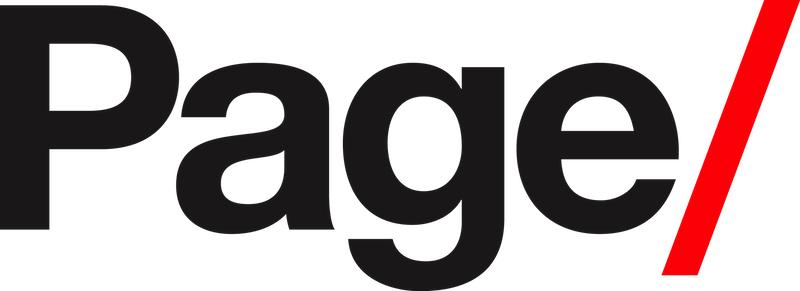
- Company type: Private company
- Industry: Architecture; engineering; urban planning; professional services
- Founded: 1898; 128 years ago Austin, Texas, U.S.
- Founders: Charles Henry Page; Louis Charles Page; Louis Southerland; Charles Henry Page Jr.; George Page
- Headquarters: Washington, DC, United States
- Number of locations: 21 offices
- Website: www.pagethink.com

Page, legally Page Southerland Page, Inc., is an architecture and engineering firm currently headquartered in Washington, DC. In revenue, it is ranked as one of the largest architecture firms in the United States.

In 2022, Page generated $516 million in revenue, the third most of any architecture engineering firm in the United States. In 2022, Page had the most design fee growth among all leading interior design firms worldwide with almost 83 million U.S. dollars. The firm that recorded the second highest design fee growth in 2022 was Gensler. As of 2024, Page operates 21 offices in the U.S., Mexico, and the United Arab Emirates.

In August 2025, Stantec acquired Page.

== History ==
In 1898, Charles Henry Page and his brother Louis Page formed Page Brother, Architects and focused on designing courthouses and public schools. Charles's son, Charles Henry Page Jr., joined the firm following Louis's death in 1934. A year later, Louis's son, Louis Charles Page Jr., partnered with his college roommate, Louis Southerland, to form the Austin-based firm Page and Southerland. Louis's brother, George Page, would join the firm in 1939 and the name changed to Page Southerland Page. The firm changed its name to just Page in 2013.

In 2022, Page bought the architectural and planning firm, EYP, merging the former Albany-based company's national offices and design portfolio. In 2023, Page acquired Davis Brody Bond, a former New York City-based architecture firm with notable projects including the National September 11 Memorial & Museum, the Portico Gallery at the Frick Collection, and the National Museum of African American History and Culture.

== Notable projects ==
- Indeed Tower, Austin, Texas, 2021
- National Museum of African American History and Culture, Washington, DC, 2016
- Architecture of Buffalo Bayou Park and The Cistern, Houston, Texas, 2016
- TDECU Football Stadium at the University of Houston, Texas, 2014
- Architecture of Discovery Green Urban Park, Houston, Texas, 2014
- US Embassy Innovation Center in Helsinki, Finland, 2014
- National September 11 Memorial & Museum, New York, New York, 2011
- The Portico Gallery at the Frick Collection, New York, New York, 2011
- Abu Dhabi National Oil Company Petroleum Institute, United Arab Emirates, 2010,
- Seay Biomedical Research Building - University of Texas Southwestern Medical Center at Dallas, Texas, 1996
- Royal Navy Hospital, Jubail, Saudi Arabia, 1978
- Travis County Courthouse, Austin, Texas, 1930
- The Littlefield Building, Austin, Texas, 1912
