= Allen Center =

Skyscraper complex in Houston, Texas

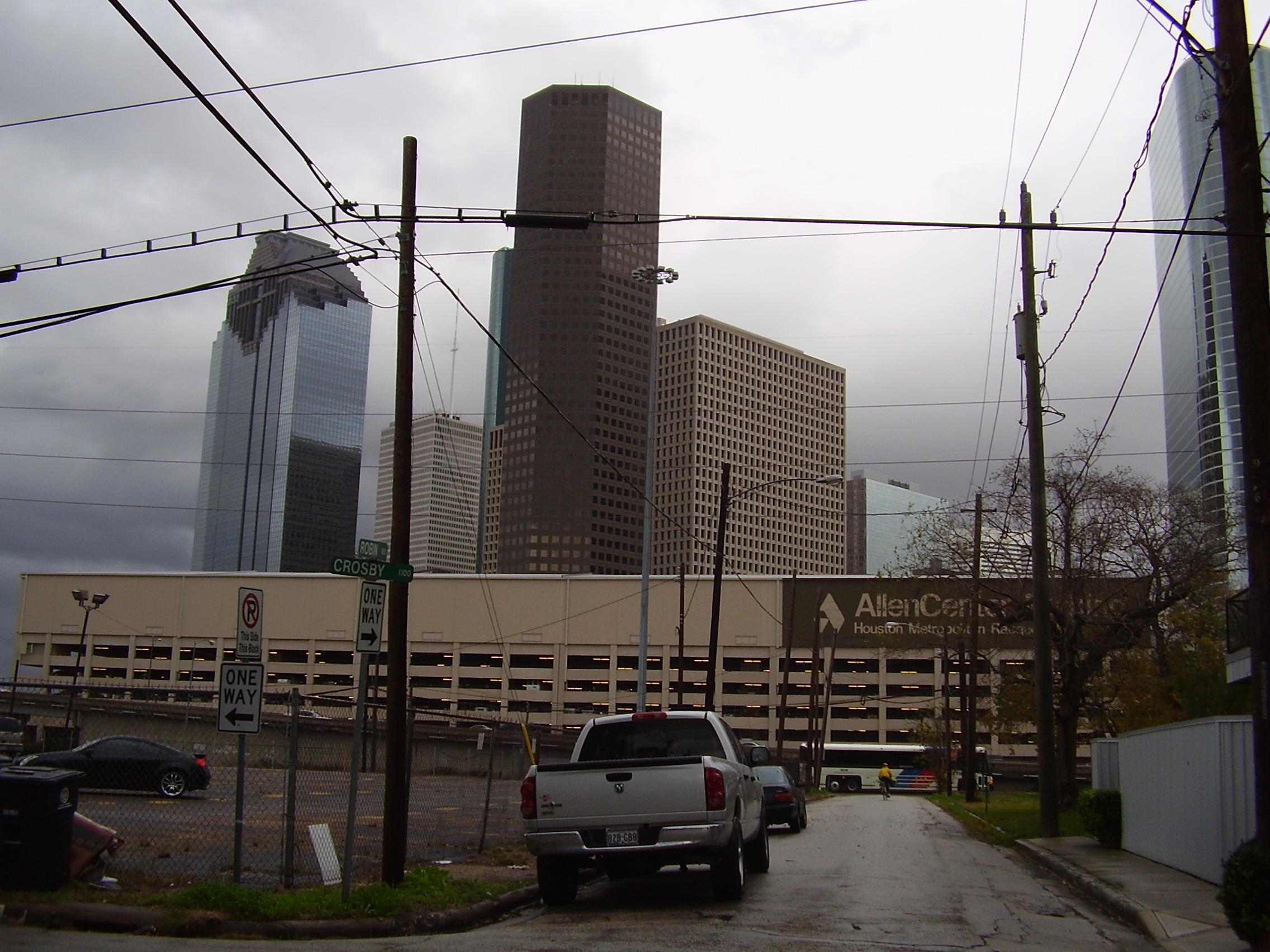
Complex

The Allen Center is a mixed-use skyscraper complex in Downtown Houston, Texas, United States. It consists of three buildings, One Allen Center (500 Dallas Street), Two Allen Center (1200 Smith Street), Three Allen Center (333 Clay Street). The complex has about 3,000,000 square feet (280,000 m^{2}) of space.

== History ==
The area that became the Allen Center was originally considered to be an eastern portion of the Fourth Ward. The opening of Interstate 45 in the 1950s separated the eastern portion from the rest of the Fourth Ward; that portion became the Allen Center and is now considered to be a part of Downtown Houston.

TrizecHahn Properties acquired the Allen Center in 1996. Trizec defeated 16 other real estate companies so it could purchase the center for an amount reported by Tanya Rutledge of the Houston Business Journal as $270 million.

When Trizec acquired the Allen Center in November 1996, the complex had a 76 percent occupancy rate. By 1997, Trizec had convinced several tenants of the Cullen Center, also owned by Trizec, to relocate to the Allen Center. Paul Layne, a vice president of the office division of Trizec, said that the shifting of tenants would lead to Allen Center having an occupancy rate of 92 percent in 1998.

In 2001, when Enron collapsed, it vacated 800,000 square feet (74,000 m^{2}) of space in the Allen Center and Cullen Center complexes in Downtown Houston.

In 2010 Devon Energy was trying to sublease about 125,000 square feet (11,600 m^{2}) of space that it occupied in the Allen Center complex. Hess Corporation announced it would vacate approximately 500,000 square feet (46,000 m^{2}) of space in the complex when a new office tower in the east side of Downtown Houston opened.

Major renovations to the property were completed in March 2021; these included new lobbies, bike storage, and a suite of rooms designated for breastfeeding mothers.

== One Allen Center ==
One Allen Center
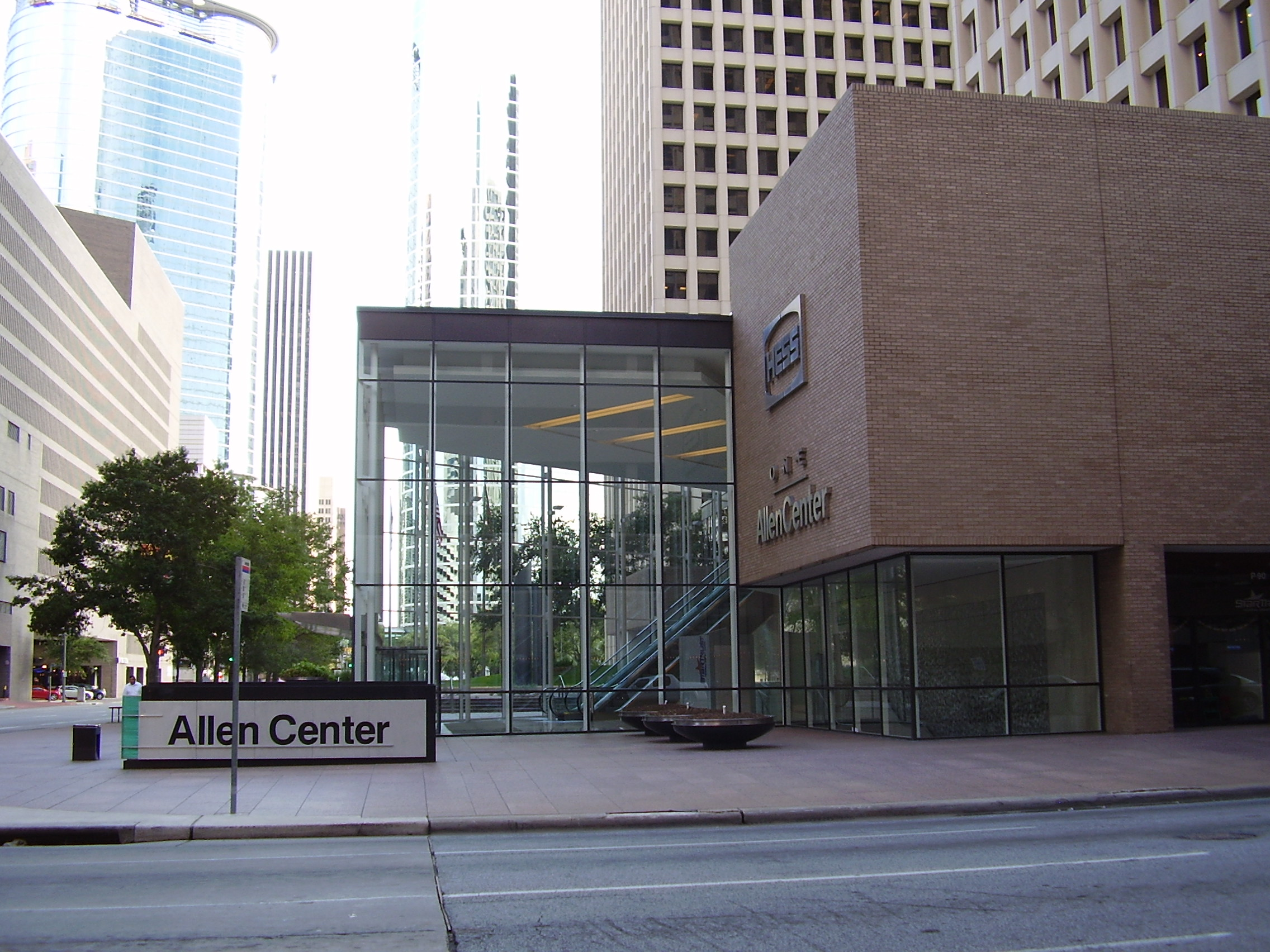
- Interactive map of the One Allen Center area

General information
- Type: Office
- Location: 500 Dallas Street, Houston, Texas
- Coordinates: 29.7575°N 95.3704°W
- Completed: 1972; 54 years ago
- Owner: Brookfield Properties

Height
- Roof: 452 ft (138 m)

Technical details
- Floor count: 34
- Floor area: 1,083,759 ft^{2} (100,684.5 m^{2})

Design and construction
- Architect: Wilson Morris Crain and Anderson
- Structural engineer: Ellisor Engineers Inc.

One Allen Center is a 452 ft (138m) tall skyscraper. It was completed in 1972 and has 34 floors. It is the 31st tallest building in the city. One Allen Center employs a composite stub-girder steel frame floor system, originally developed in part by Joseph Colaco then of Ellisor Engineers Inc., currently of CBM Engineers, Inc.

Macquarie Bank houses its Houston representative office in Suite 3100 of the building.

Houston Public Library (HPL) maintains its Booklink facility there.

== Two Allen Center ==
Two Allen Center was previously known as the Citicorp Building.

== Three Allen Center ==
Three Allen Center
- Interactive map of the Three Allen Center area

General information
- Type: Office
- Location: 333 Clay Street, Houston, Texas
- Coordinates: 29.75738°N 95.37183°W
- Completed: 1983; 43 years ago
- Operator: Brookfield Properties

Height
- Roof: 685 ft (209 m)

Technical details
- Floor count: 50
- Floor area: 1,447,729 ft^{2} (134,498.4 m^{2})

Design and construction
- Architects: Lloyd Jones Brewer & Associates

Three Allen Center is a 685-foot (209 m) tall skyscraper completed in 1983 with 50 floors. It is the 12th-tallest building in the city.

- Macquarie Capital (USA) Inc. has an office in Suite 4200.
- Oil States International (NYSE: OIS) has an office in Suite 4620.

== Tenants ==
One Allen Center

- Don Patron Bar and Grill - Lobby
  - Operated a sit-down restaurant and a breakfast and lunch taco bar. The restaurant was active for around 20 years, servicing local office workers and catering corporate office parties. Phaedra Cook of the Houston Press wrote that Don Patron "hasn't been a critical darling of food writers in a long time" but that "it has been an important part of work life for thousands of people who work in" the complex and that "it's been treasured for good Tex-Mex plates and as a convenient spot for business lunches[...]and was great for indulging in an after-work margarita or two, also." In 2016 the management revealed plans to remodel the lobby area of One Allen Center; Don Patron's dining hall was closed by February 29, 2016, and the taco stand is scheduled to close on Friday March 5, 2016. The owners of Don Patron will continue to operate Tejas Grill & Sports Bar.
- Coastal Water Authority - Suite 2800

Two Allen Center

- Qatar Airways, Suite 1600
- Chamberlain Hrdlicka law firm in Suite 1400 on the 13th and 14th floors.

Three Allen Center

- The headquarters of Plains All American Pipeline, Suite 1600
- EOG Resources had space in Allen Center; in 2006 it announced that it was moving to the Heritage Plaza. It planned to move 400 employees there by early 2007. When it occupied portions of Three Allen Center, EOG had 165,000 square feet (15,300 m^{2}) of space occupied scattered throughout Three Allen Center.

At one point the Consulate-General of Switzerland in Houston resided in Suite 1040 of Two Allen Center; the mission closed in 2006.

== See also ==
- List of tallest buildings in Houston
- List of tallest buildings in Texas
