= Nexen Building =

Office building

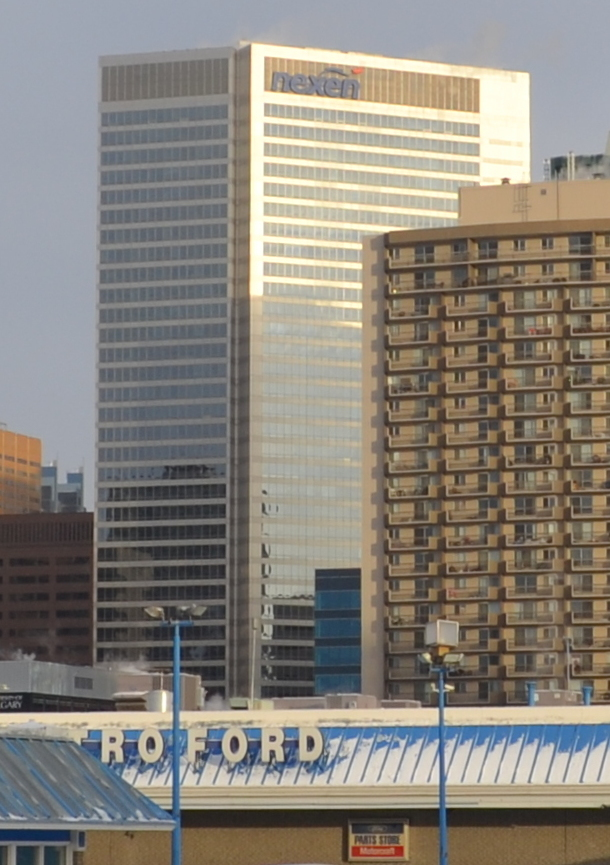

General information
- Status: Occupied
- Type: Office
- Location: Calgary, Alberta, Canada
- Coordinates: 51°02′47″N 114°04′46″W
- Completed: 1982
- Cost: $121,931,465
- Owner: Ursataur Capital Management

Height
- Roof: 152 m (499 ft)

Technical details
- Floor count: 37
- Floor area: 55,855 m^{2} (601,220 sq ft)

Design and construction
- Architects: CPV Group Architects and Engineers
- Main contractor: CANA Construction Company

801 Seventh Avenue S.W., commonly known as the Nexen Building, is a high rise office building in downtown Calgary, Alberta, Canada.

It is a 37-storey skyscraper, with a height of 153 m (502 ft). It was designed by CPV Group Architects and Engineers Ltd and built by CANA Construction Company Limited. The late-modernist building was completed in 1982.

The Nexen Building employs a composite stub-girder steel-frame floor system, originally developed in part by Joseph Colaco.

It is unique in that it is one of the few buildings in Calgary that do not follow the traditional grid pattern of the downtown core. Instead of facing south–north, or east–west, it stands diagonally.

== Tenants ==
The original tenant of the Nexen Building was the NOVA Corporation. In 2000, the building became Nexen's headquarters. Nexen was purchased by Chinese state-owned CNOOC in 2013 and reduced its workforce over time.

Nexen moved from the Nexen Building in 2019, instead subleasing 8 floors of The Bow from Cenovus, leaving the Nexen Building vacant from 2019 to 2025

In 2025 the University of Calgary's School of Architecture, Planning and Landscape announced they are leasing the Annex and 9 floors of the Nexen Building. An unnamed Data Centre is also leasing 1 floor.

== See also ==
- List of tallest buildings in Calgary
