= North Sea oil =

Hydrocarbons from the North Sea

North Sea oil and gas fields

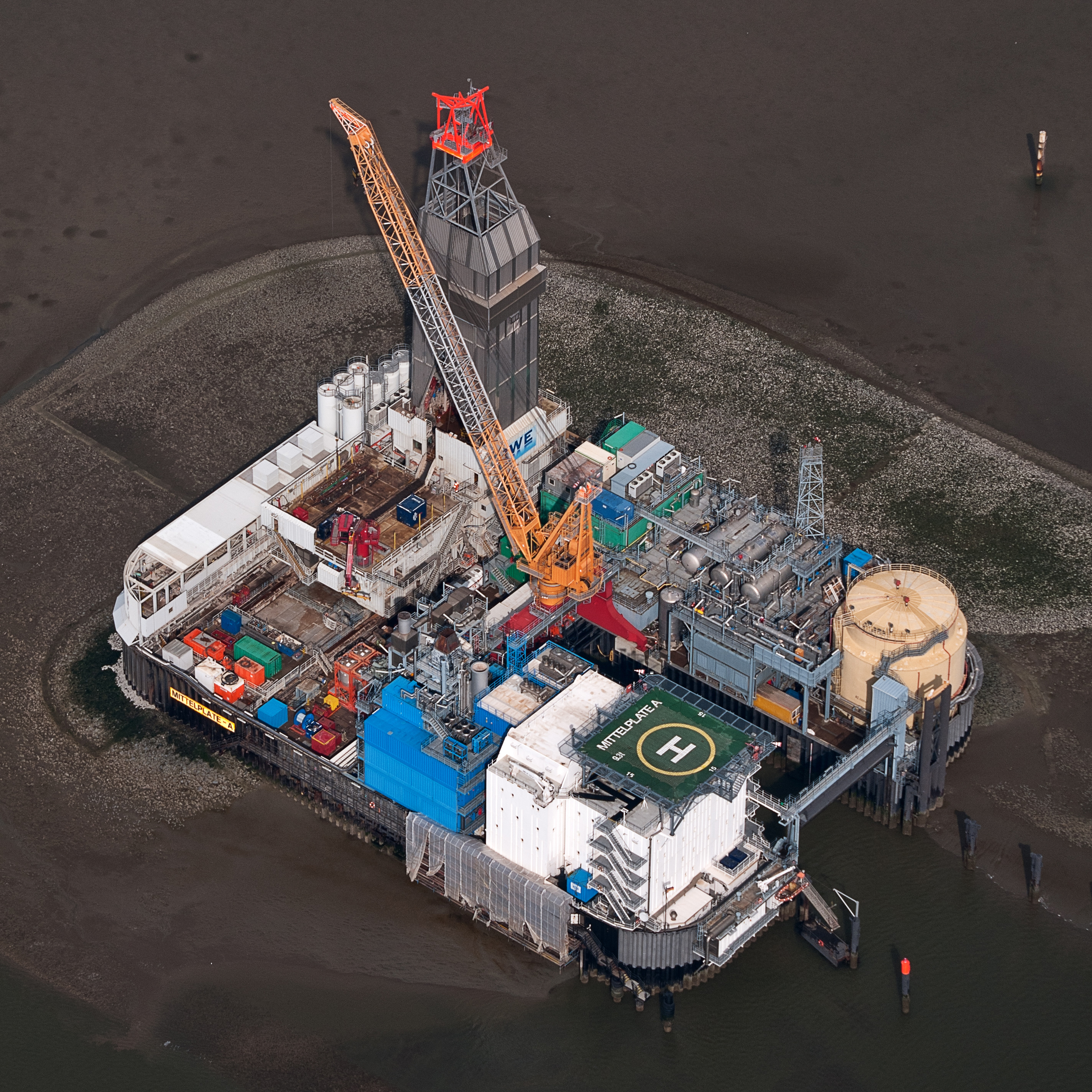
An oil platform in Mittelplate, Wadden Sea

North Sea oil is a mixture of hydrocarbons, comprising liquid petroleum and natural gas, produced from petroleum reservoirs beneath the North Sea.

In the petroleum industry, the term "North Sea" often includes areas such as the Norwegian Sea and the area known as "West of Shetland", "the Atlantic Frontier" or "the Atlantic Margin" that is not geographically part of the North Sea.

Brent crude is still used today as a standard benchmark for pricing oil, although the contract now refers to a blend of oils from fields in the northern North Sea.

From the 1960s to 2014 it was reported that 42 billion barrels of oil equivalent (BOE) had been extracted from the North Sea since when production began. As there is still an estimated 24 billion BOE potentially remaining in the reservoir (equivalent to about 35 years worth of production), the North Sea will remain as an important petroleum reservoir for years to come. However, this is the upper end of a range of estimates provided by Sir Ian Wood (commissioned by the UK government to carry out a review of the oil industry in the United Kingdom); the lower end was 12 billion barrels. Wood, upset with how his figures were being used, said the most likely amount to be found would be between 15 billion and 16 billion barrels.

== History ==
=== 1851–1963 ===
Commercial extraction of oil on the shores of the North Sea dates back to 1851, when James Young retorted oil from torbanite (boghead coal, or oil shale) mined in the Midland Valley of Scotland. Across the sea in Germany, oil was found in the Wietze field near Hanover in 1859, leading to the discovery of seventy more fields, mostly in Lower Cretaceous and Jurassic reservoirs, producing a combined total of around 1340 m³ (8,400 barrels) per day.

Gas was found by chance in a water well near Hamburg in 1910, leading to minor gas discoveries in Zechstein dolomites elsewhere in Germany. In England, BP discovered gas in similar reservoirs in the Eskdale anticline in 1938, and in 1939 they found commercial oil in Carboniferous rocks at Eakring in Nottinghamshire. Discoveries elsewhere in the East Midlands lifted production to 400 m^{3} (2,500 barrels) per day, and a second wave of exploration from 1953 to 1961 found the Gainsborough field and ten smaller fields.

The Netherlands' first oil shows were seen in a drilling demonstration at De Mient during the 1938 World Petroleum Congress at The Hague. Subsequent exploration led to the 1943 discovery by Exploratie Nederland, part of the Royal Dutch/Shell company Bataafsche Petroleum Maatschappij, of oil under the Dutch village of Schoonebeek, near the German border. NAM found the Netherlands' first gas in Zechstein carbonates at Coevorden in 1948. 1952 saw the first exploration well in the province of Groningen, Haren-1, which was the first to penetrate the Lower Permian Rotliegendes sandstone that is the main reservoir for the gas fields of the southern North Sea, although in Haren-1 it contained only water. The Ten Boer well failed to reach target depth for technical reasons, but was completed as a minor gas producer from the Zechstein carbonates. The Slochteren-1 well found gas in the Rotliegendes in 1959, although the full extent of what became known as the Groningen gas field was not appreciated until 1963—it is currently estimated at 96×10^{12} cu ft (2,700 km^{3}) recoverable gas reserves. Smaller discoveries to the west of Groningen followed.

=== 1964–present ===
The UK Continental Shelf Act came into force in May 1964. Seismic exploration and the first well followed later that year. It and a second well on the Mid North Sea High were dry, as the Rotliegendes was absent, but BP's Sea Gem rig struck gas in the West Sole Field in September 1965. The celebrations were short-lived since the Sea Gem sank, with the loss of 13 lives, after part of the rig collapsed as it was moved away from the discovery well. The Viking Gas Field was discovered in December 1965 with the Conoco/National Coal Board well 49/17-1, finding the gas-bearing Permian Rotliegend Sandstone at a depth of 2,756 m subsea. Helicopters were first used to transport workers. Larger gas finds followed in 1966 – Leman Bank, Indefatigable and Hewett – but by 1968 companies had lost interest in further exploration of the British sector, a result of a ban on gas exports and low prices offered by the only buyer, British Gas. West Sole came onstream in May 1967. Licensing regulations for Dutch waters were not finalised until 1967.

The situation was transformed in December 1969, when Phillips Petroleum discovered oil in Chalk of Danian age at Ekofisk, in Norwegian waters in the central North Sea. The same month, Amoco discovered the Montrose Field about 217 km (135 mi) east of Aberdeen. The original objective of the well had been to drill for gas to test the idea that the southern North Sea gas province extended to the north. Amoco were astonished when the well discovered oil. lBP had been awarded several licences in the area in the second licensing round late in 1965, but had been reluctant to work on them. The discovery of Ekofisk prompted them to drill what turned out to be a dry hole in May 1970, followed by the discovery of the giant Forties Oil Field in October 1970. The following year, Shell Expro discovered the giant Brent oilfield in the northern North Sea east of Shetland in Scotland and the Petronord Group discovered the Frigg gas field. The Piper oilfield was discovered in 1973 and the Statfjord Field and the Ninian Field in 1974, with the Ninian reservoir consisting of Middle Jurassic sandstones at a depth of 3000 m subsea in a "westward tilted horst block".

Offshore production, like that of the North Sea, became more economical after the 1973 oil crisis caused the world oil price to quadruple, followed by the 1979 oil crisis, which caused another tripling in the oil price. Oil production started from the Argyll & Duncan Oilfields (now the Ardmore) in June 1975 followed by Forties Oil Field in November of that year. The inner Moray Firth Beatrice Field, a Jurassic sandstone/shale reservoir 1829 m deep in a "fault-bounded anticlinal trap", was discovered in 1976 with well 11/30-1, drilled by the Mesa Petroleum Group (named after T. Boone Pickens' wife Bea, "the only oil field in the North Sea named for a woman") in 49 m of water.

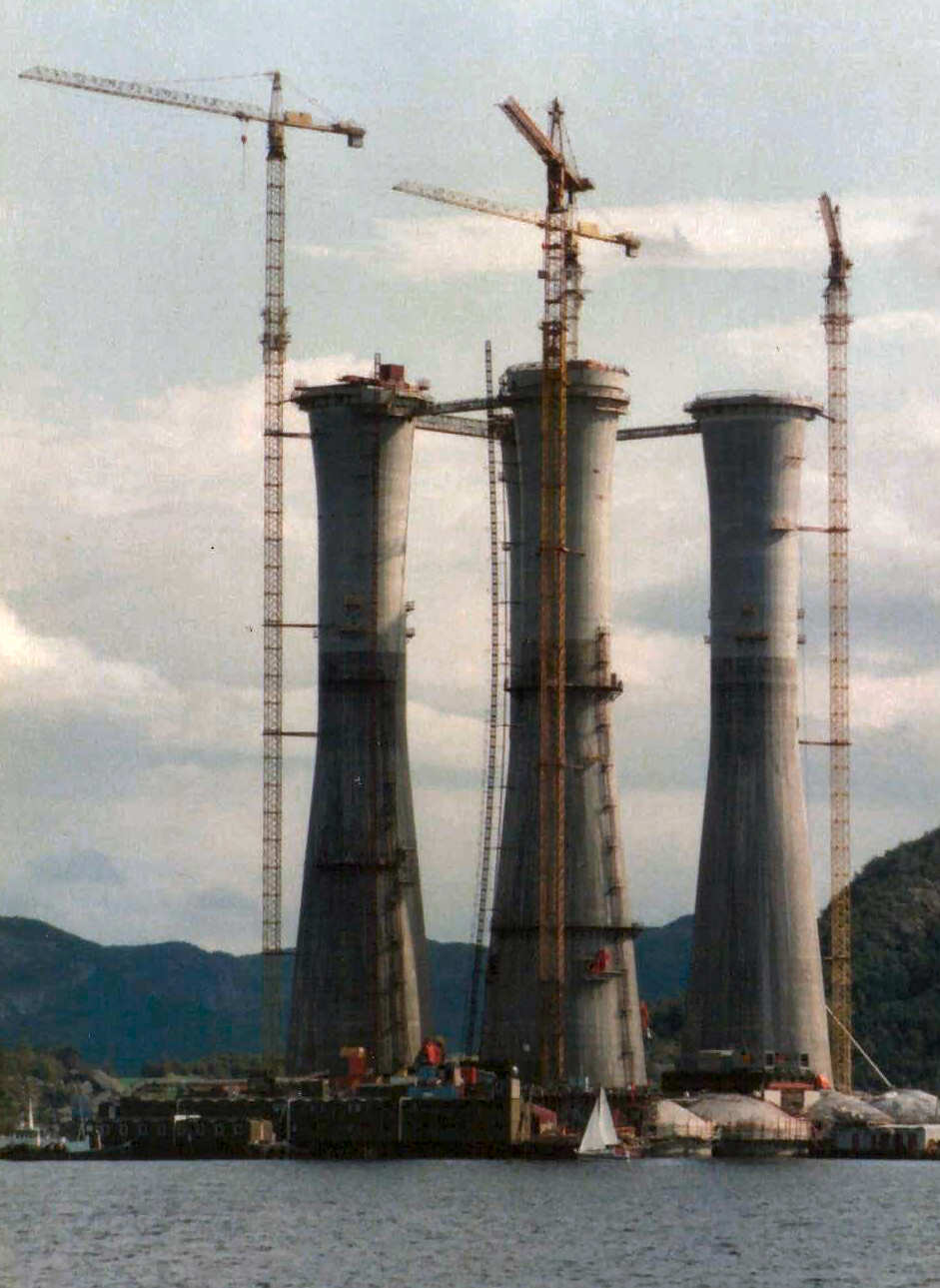
A 'Statfjord' gravity-based structure under construction in Norway. Almost all of the structure was submerged.

Volatile weather conditions in Europe's North Sea have made drilling particularly hazardous, claiming many lives (see Oil platform). The conditions also make extraction a costly process; by the 1980s, costs for developing new methods and technologies to make the process both efficient and safe far exceeded NASA's budget to land a man on the moon.

The Gullfaks oil field was discovered in 1978. The Snorre Field was discovered in 1979, producing from the Triassic Lunde Formation and the Triassic-Jurassic Statfjord Formation, both fluvial sandstones in a mudstone matrix. The Oseberg oil field and Troll gas field were also discovered in 1979. The Miller oilfield was discovered in 1983. The Alba Field produces from sandstones in the middle Eocene Alba Formation at 1860 m subsea and was discovered in 1984 in UKCS Block 16/26. The Smørbukk Field was discovered in 1984 in 250–300 m of water that produces from Lower to Middle Jurassic sandstone formations within a fault block. The Snøhvit Gas Field and the Draugen oil field were discovered in 1984. The Heidrun oil field was discovered in 1985.

The largest UK field discovered in the 21st century is Buzzard, also located off Scotland, found in June 2001 with producible reserves of almost 64 million cubic metres (400 million bbl) and an average output of 28,600 m^{3} to 30,200 m^{3} (180,000–220,000 bbl) per day.

The largest field found in the 21st century on the Norwegian part of the North Sea is the Johan Sverdrup oil field, which was discovered in 2010. It is one of the largest discoveries made in the Norwegian Continental Shelf. Total reserves of the field are estimated at 1.7 to 3.3 billion barrels of gross recoverable oil, and Johan Sverdrup is expected to produce 120,000 to 200,000 barrels of oil per day. Production started on 5 October 2019.

As of January 2015, the North Sea was the world's most active offshore drilling region, with 173 active rigs drilling. By May 2016, the North Sea oil and gas industry was financially stressed by the reduced oil prices, and called for government support.

The distances, number of workplaces, and fierce weather in the 750,000 square kilometre (290,000 square mile) North Sea area require the world's largest fleet of heavy instrument flight rules (IFR) helicopters, some specifically developed for the North Sea. They carry about two million passengers per year from sixteen onshore bases, of which Aberdeen Airport is the world's busiest, with 500,000 passengers per year.

== Licensing ==
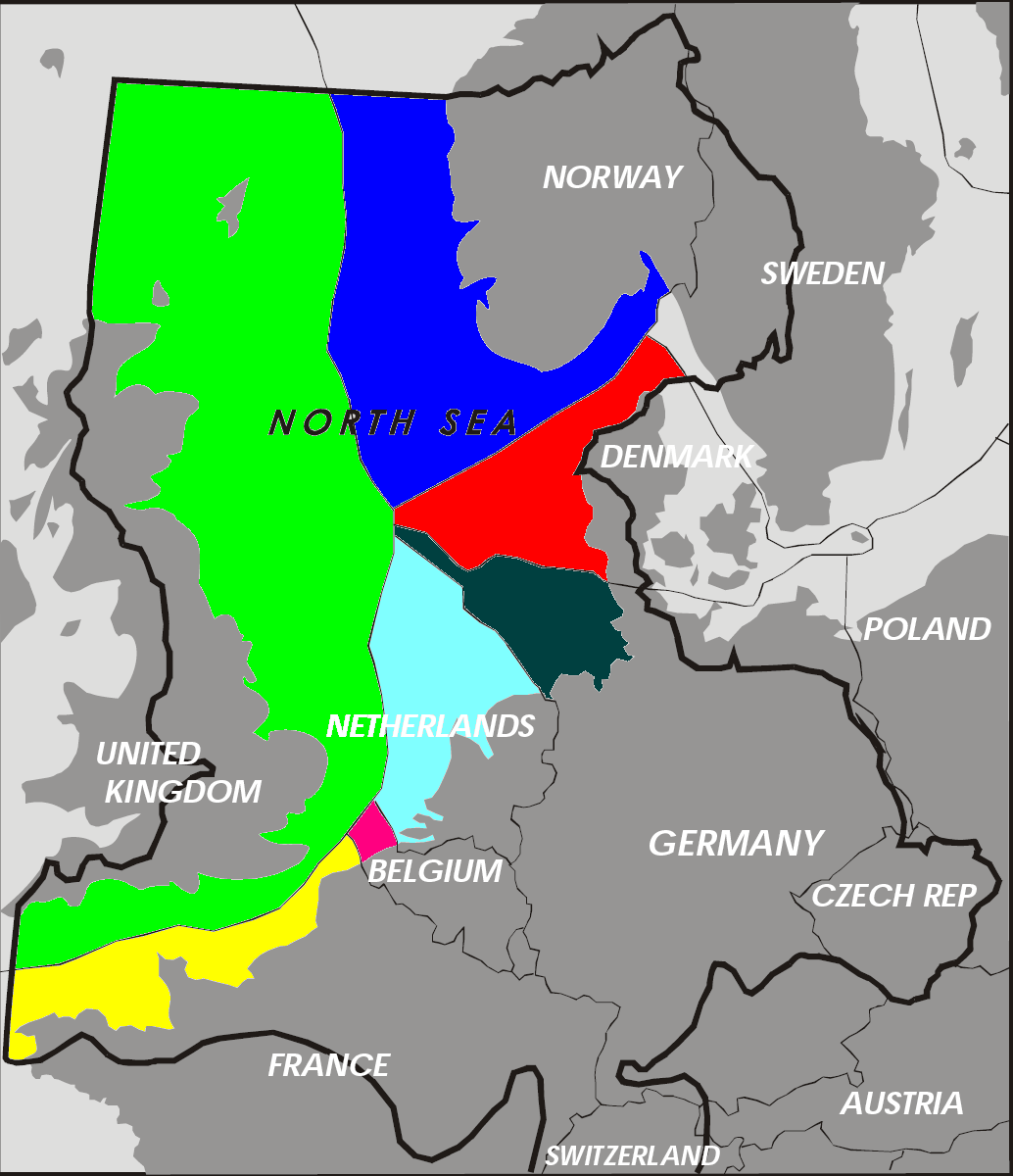
The Exclusive Economic Zones in the North Sea

Following the 1958 Convention on the Continental Shelf and after some disputes on the rights to natural resource exploitation the national limits of the exclusive economic zones were ratified. Five countries are involved in oil production in the North Sea. All operate a tax and royalty licensing regime. The respective sectors are divided by median lines agreed in the late 1960s:

- Norway – Oljedirektoratet (the Norwegian Petroleum Directorate) grants licences. The NCS is also divided into quads of 1 degree by 1 degree. Norwegian licence blocks are larger than British blocks, being 15 minutes of latitude by 20 minutes of longitude (12 blocks in a quad). Like in Britain, there are numerous part blocks formed by re-licensing relinquished areas.
- United Kingdom – Exploration and production licences are regulated by the North Sea Transition Authority following the 2014 Wood Review on maximising UKCS (United Kingdom Continental Shelf) oil and gas recovery. Licences were formerly granted by the Department of Energy and Climate Change (DECC – formerly the Department of Trade and Industry). The UKCS is divided into quadrants of 1 degree latitude and 1 degree longitude. Each quadrant is divided into 30 blocks measuring 10 minutes of latitude and 12 minutes of longitude. Some blocks are divided further into part blocks where some areas are relinquished by previous licensees. For example, block 13/24a is located in quad 13 and is the 24th block and is the 'a' part block. The UK government has traditionally issued licences via periodic (now annual) licensing rounds. Blocks are awarded on the basis of the work programme bid by the participants. The UK government has actively solicited new entrants to the UKCS via "promote" licensing rounds with less demanding terms and the fallow acreage initiative, where non-active licences have to be relinquished.
- Denmark – Energistyrelsen (the Danish Energy Agency) administers the Danish sector. The Danes also divide their sector of the North Sea into 1 degree by 1 degree quadrants. Their blocks, however, are 10 minutes latitude by 15 minutes longitude. Part blocks exist where partial relinquishment has taken place.
- Germany – Germany and the Netherlands share a quadrant and block grid—quadrants are given letters rather than numbers. The blocks are 10 minutes latitude by 20 minutes longitude.
- Netherlands – The Dutch sector is located in the Southern Gas Basin and shares a grid pattern with Germany.

== Reserves and production ==
The Norwegian and British sectors held most of the large oil reserves. It was estimated in 2007 that the Norwegian sector alone contains 54% of the sea's oil reserves and 45% of its gas reserves. More than half of the North Sea oil reserves had been extracted as of 2007, according to official sources in both Norway and the UK. For Norway, Oljedirektoratet gave a figure of 4,601 million cubic metres of oil (corresponding to 29 billion barrels) for the Norwegian North Sea alone (excluding smaller reserves in Norwegian Sea and Barents Sea) of which 2,778 million cubic metres (60%) had already been produced prior to January 2007. UK sources give a range of estimates of reserves, but even using the most optimistic "maximum" estimate of ultimate recovery, 76% had been recovered as of the end of 2010. Note the UK figure includes fields which are not in the North Sea (onshore, West of Shetland).

United Kingdom Continental Shelf production was 137 million tonnes of oil and 105 billion cubic metres of gas in 1999. (1 tonne of crude oil converts to 7.5 barrels). The Danish explorations of Cenozoic stratigraphy, undertaken in the 1990s, showed petroleum-rich reserves in the northern Danish sector, especially the Central Graben area. The Dutch area of the North Sea followed through with onshore and offshore gas exploration, and well creation. Exact figures are debatable, because methods of estimating reserves vary and it is often difficult to forecast future discoveries.

== Peaking and decline ==
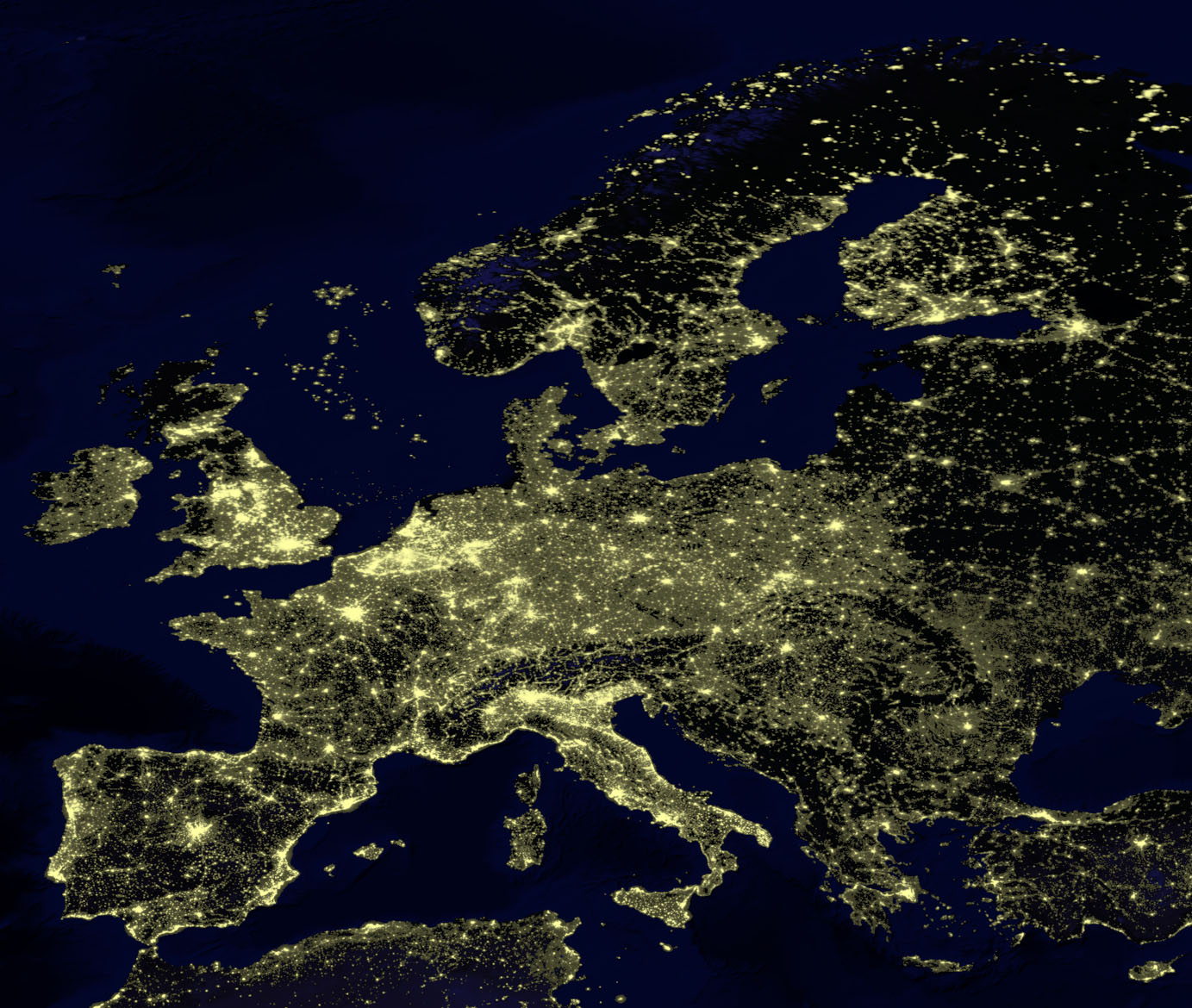
The oil rigs in the North Sea show up in this satellite photo of Europe taken at night in 2002.

Official production data from 1995 to 2020 is published by the UK government. Table 3.10 lists annual production, import and exports over that period. When it peaked in 1999, production of North Sea oil was 128 million tonnes per year, approx, 950,000 m³ (6 million barrels) per day, having risen by ~ 5% from the early 1990s. However, by 2010 this had halved to under 60 million tonnes/year, and continued declining further, and between 2015 and 2020 has hovered between 40 and 50 million tonnes/year, at around 35% of the 1999 peak. From 2005 the UK became a net importer of crude oil, and as production declined, the amount imported has slowly risen to ~ 20 million tonnes per year by 2020.

Similar historical data is available for gas. Natural gas production peaked at nearly 10 trillion cubic feet (280 billion m³) in 2001 representing some 1.2GWhr of energy; by 2018 UK production had declined to 1.4 trillion cubic feet, (41 billion m³). Over a similar period energy from gas imports have risen by a factor of approximately 10, from 60 GWh in 2001 to just over 500 GWh in 2019.

UK oil production has seen two peaks, in the mid-1980s and the late 1990s, with a decline to around 300×10^{3} m³ (1.9 million barrels) per day in the early 1990s. Monthly oil production peaked at 13.5 million m³ (84.9 million barrels) in January 1985 although the highest annual production was seen in 1999, with offshore oil production in that year of 407 million m³ (398 million barrels) and had declined to 231 million m³ (220 million barrels) in 2007. This was the largest decrease of any oil-exporting nation in the world, and has led to Britain becoming a net importer of crude for the first time in decades, as recognized by the energy policy of the United Kingdom. Norwegian crude oil production as of 2013 is 1.4 mbpd. This is a more than 50% decline since the peak in 2001 of 3.2 mbpd.

Hundreds of new North Sea oil and gas licences were granted in seven licensing rounds between 2010 and 2024, which led to the creation of 20 new or relicensed fields believed to offer the equivalent of six months of UK gas supply; however The Guardian reported that as of 2026 they had only produced about a fifth of that.

=== Geology ===
The geological disposition of the UK's oil and gas fields is outlined in the following table.

North Sea oil and gas fields – geology
Geological era	Geological epoch	Age, million years	Fields
Tertiary	Pliocene	2–5	
Tertiary	Miocene	5–23	
Tertiary	Oligocene	23–34	
Tertiary	Eocene	34–56	Frigg, Gannet, Alba
Tertiary	Palaeocene	56–66	Arbroath, Balmoral, Everest, Forties, Heimdal, Maureen, Montrose, Nelson
Mesozoic	Cretaceous	66–145	Lower: Britannia, Scapa
Mesozoic	Jurassic	145–201	Upper: Moray Firth fields, Brae, Buzzard, Claymore, Fulmar, Magnus, Piper, Scott, Tiffany Kittiwake, Gannet Middle: Brent, Bruce, Eider, Heather, Hutton, Ninian, Tern Lower to Middle: Beatrice
Mesozoic	Triassic	201–252	Upper: Beryl Dotty, Douglas, Esmond, Hamilton, J-Block, Morecambe Bay Lower: Hewett
Palaeozoic	Permian	252–299	Upper Permian (Zechstein): Argyll, Auk Lower Permian (Rotliegend): Camelot, Indefatigable, Leman, Viking, West Sole
Palaeozoic	Carboniferous	299–359	Caister, Murdoch
Palaeozoic	Devonian	359–419	Buchan
Palaeozoic	Silurian	419–444	
Palaeozoic	Ordovician	444–485	
Palaeozoic	Cambrian	485–541	

== Carbon dioxide sequestration ==
In the North Sea, Norway's Equinor natural-gas platform Sleipner strips carbon dioxide out of the natural gas with amine solvents and disposes of this carbon dioxide by geological sequestration ("carbon sequestration") while keeping up gas production pressure. Sleipner reduces emissions of carbon dioxide by approximately one million tonnes a year; that is about 1/9000th of global emissions. The cost of geological sequestration is minor relative to the overall running costs.

== See also ==
- 1990 Norwegian oil workers' strike
- Carbon sink
- Category of Oil fields in Norway
- Commercial offshore diving in the North Sea
- Dutch disease
- Energy use and conservation in the United Kingdom
- Oil industry in Scotland
  - It's Scotland's oil
- List of oil and gas fields of the North Sea
- Oil and gas industry in the United Kingdom
- Oil platform
- Oil reserves in France
- Subsea
