= Michael Green (architect) =

Canadian architect

Michael Green is a Canadian architect, co-founder of Michael Green Architecture which he leads with firm partner Natalie Telewiak, and an author of books on mass timber construction. The Case for Tall Wood Buildings is a case study on using materials such as cross-laminated timber panels and engineered glulam wood beams to build skyscrapers as tall as 30 storeys, originally prepared in 2012 by Green, Equilibrium Consulting, LMDG Ltd. and BTY Group. Green also coauthored Tall Wood Buildings: Design, Construction and Performance, which was published by Birkhäuser in 2017. In March 2020, Birkhäuser published the second and expanded edition of this book. In 2013, Green gave a TED talk titled “Why we should build Wooden Skyscrapers’. In 2014, Green received an honorary doctorate degree from the University of Northern British Columbia.

Michael Green is the founder of Design Build Research and Timber Online Education, a non-profit school and research platform dedicated to teaching the design and construction of socially, culturally and environmentally relevant student-led installations with a focus in systemic change in building for climate, environment, disaster and global shelter needs. Green’s architecture firm Michael Green Architecture designed the seven-story T3 building in Minneapolis, which was built using 3,600 cubic metres of wood, and is intended to sequester about 3,200 tonnes of carbon for the life of the building.

In 2021, MGA | Michael Green Architecture was chosen as Best Firm in North America by Architizer Magazine.

== Publications ==
- The Case for Tall Wood Buildings, -2012
- Technical guide for the design and construction of tall wood buildings in Canada, FP Innovation -2014
- Alpenglow, -2015
- The Case for Tall Wood Buildings (2nd Edition), -2017
- Tall Wood Buildings: Design, Construction and Performance., Birkhäuser -2017
- Tall Wood Buildings: Design, Construction and Performance (2nd Expanded Edition), Birkhäuser -2020
- Technical guide for the design and construction of tall wood buildings in Canada (2021 Edition), FP Innovation -IN PROGRESS

== Recognition ==
Michael Green was the Project Principal for MGA's four Governor General’s Awards for Ronald McDonald House,* Wood Innovation and Design Centre, North Vancouver City Hall,** and the Royal Vancouver Yacht Club Dock Building.

*Project began at McFarlane Green Biggar Architecture + Design and completed at Michael Green Architecture **Lead Design Architect: Michael Green, formerly of McFarlane Green Biggar Architecture + Design, now of Michael Green Architecture
