= New Orleans CityBusiness =

Bi-weekly newspaper published in Metairie, Louisiana, U.S.

- Type: Bi-weekly newspaper
- Format: print and online
- Owner: BridgeTower Media
- Publisher: Lisa Blossman
- Editor: Lance Traweek
- Founded: 1980
- Headquarters: 3350 Ridgelake Dr., Suite 281; Metairie, LA 70002; United States
- Website: www.neworleanscitybusiness.com

New Orleans CityBusiness is a bi-weekly business newspaper headquartered in Metairie, Louisiana, United States. The newspaper publishes daily content online at neworleanscitybusiness.com.

Launched in 1980, CityBusiness covers the metropolitan New Orleans area, including the North Shore of Lake Pontchartrain.

New Orleans Publishing Group, owned by BridgeTower Media, publishes CityBusiness and the Daily Journal of Commerce. NOPG also produces custom publications, special publications and an annual Book of Lists and North Shore Book of Lists.

== Hurricane Katrina ==
Hurricane Katrina forced CityBusiness out of its offices on the 14th floor of Heritage Plaza, 111 Veterans Memorial Blvd., when the August 29, 2005, storm bore down on the city. The newspaper never stopped printing, despite the storm. Staff members were able to publish the paper out of the offices of The (Maryland) Daily Record, CityBusiness’ Baltimore-based sister publication. Staff members scattered across the United States filed stories to fill the paper's pages and update the Web site. While Heritage Plaza remained closed – it did not reopen until November 2005 – CityBusiness operated out of offices in Baton Rouge.

== Events ==
New Orleans CityBusiness hosts annual events, all coinciding with special issues of the paper. These include: Women of the Year, Best Places to Work, Health Care Heroes, Leadership in Law and Money Makers. New events include Reader Rankings and ICON Awards.
