= CNOOC Petroleum North America =

Chinese oil and gas company, Alberta, Canada-based subsidiary of CNOOC

Coordinates: 51°2′47″N 114°4′47″W

CNOOC Petroleum North America ULC
- Formerly: CNOOC Nexen (2013-2018); Nexen (2000-2013); Canadian Occidental (1971-2000)
- Type: Subsidiary
- Industry: Oil and gas, energy
- Founded: 12 July 1971
- Headquarters: Calgary, Alberta, Canada
- Key people: Fang Zhi (CEO); Li Fanrong (Chairman)
- Revenue: $6.7 billion CAD (2012)
- Net income: $333 million CAD (2012)
- Total equity: $8.8 billion CAD (2012)
- Number of employees: 3,000 (2013)
- Parent: CNOOC Limited
- Website: intl.cnoocltd.com/operations/americas/canada

CNOOC Petroleum North America ULC, formerly known as Nexen, is a Canadian oil and gas company based in Calgary, Alberta.

Originally the Canadian subsidiary of US-based Occidental Petroleum (known as Canadian Occidental Petroleum or CanOxy), it became an independent company, Nexen, in 2000. Nexen was acquired by Hong Kong–based CNOOC Limited in 2013, and was rebranded under the current name at the end of 2018.

It had three growth strategies as of 2013: oil sands and shale gas in western Canada as well as conventional exploration and development primarily in the North Sea, offshore in West Africa, and deepwater exploration in the Gulf of Mexico.

== History ==
Nexen started in 1971 as Canadian Occidental Petroleum (CanOxy), and was 80% owned by Occidental Petroleum, an oil company based in Los Angeles. In the first decade of its existence, CanOxy was fairly Canadian-oriented. During the 1980s and 1990s they increased their international holdings, first in the Gulf of Mexico, then into places like Yemen and the North Sea. Further Canadian assets were also acquired.

In the 1990s, CanOxy purchased the assets of what once was the first state-owned oil and gas company in North America; Wascana Energy Inc., formerly known as SaskOil. Founded by Saskatchewan New Democratic Party Premier Allan Blakeney in 1973, Saskoil was privatized in 1986 by Progressive Conservative Premier Grant Devine.

In 2000, the company partnered with the Ontario Teachers' Pension Plan to buy back Occidental Petroleum's shares. The newly independent company changed its name to Nexen and moved into the former headquarters of NOVA Corporation, what is now known as the Nexen Building.

=== Acquisition by CNOOC Limited ===
In July 2012, CNOOC Limited, a major subsidiary of CNOOC headquartered in Beijing, announced its intention to acquire Nexen for C$15.1 billion. The proposal was accepted by shareholders in September under interim chief executive Kevin Reinhart, but was a matter of significant public and political debate in Canada. Prime Minister Stephen Harper approved the deal in December 2012 but simultaneously announced more stringent guidelines for foreign acquisitions of Canadian oil sands companies.

The acquisition closed in February 2013, representing China's largest-ever foreign acquisition. Nexen's common stock shareholders received cash proceeds of US$27.50, without interest, whereas preferred stock shareholders of Nexen received cash proceeds of CAD$26, plus accrued and unpaid dividends without interest. In April 2014, Fang Zhi replaced Kevin Reinhart as the firm's chief executive. Two years after the deal, in 2015, about 14% of the company's workforce (300 in Calgary and 40 in the field) was fired in a move that drew concern in relation to Chinese ownership, but which at the time was consistent with layoffs at other companies in the industry in response to global oil price depression.

The Nexen name disappeared from both legal and practical perspectives on 31 December 2018, and it became known as CNOOC Petroleum North America ULC henceforth. Simultaneously and with the same date of effectiveness, related Nexen subsidiaries and affiliates changed both their legal and branding names. Its American depository receipts remained concurrently traded on the TSX and its ultimate parent company, CNOOC Limited, remained a foreign reporting issuer in Canada.

As of 2019 the company had "shrunk considerably" since the CNOOC acquisition, having gone through multiple rounds of layoffs amid a difficult Canadian oil and gas industry as a whole. In 2019 the company moved its headquarters within downtown Calgary from its former namesake Nexen Building to The Bow, subleasing 8 floors from Cenovus and reducing its office space from approximately 620,000 sq ft to approximately 300,000 sq ft.

== Energy operations ==
Nexen has interests in Canada (including the Athabasca oil sands through a 7.23% ownership of Syncrude and the Long Lake project), the UK North Sea (including the Buzzard oil field), the United States, and offshore West Africa. Beginning in February 2013, Nexen took accountability for managing approximately $8 billion in CNOOC Limited assets located throughout North and Central America.

=== Long Lake ===
The Long Lake project in the Athabasca Oil Sands was initiated in 2001, as a 50/50 partnership between Nexen and OPTI Canada. It was started in order to develop the Long Lake site using steam-assisted gravity drainage and OPTI's OrCrude process for on-site upgrading. Production capacity at Long Lake was estimated 72,000 barrels per day (11,400 m^{3}/d) of bitumen per day which could be upgraded to 58,500 barrels per day (9,300 m^{3}/d) of synthetic crude. The proved reserves at the Long Lake site are 310,000,000 bbls. In 2017, the site produced approximately 41,000 barrels per day (6,500 m^{3}/d) of bitumen.

The Long Lake site has had a troubled history, including OPTI's near-bankruptcy in 2011 (with Nexen growing its ownership stake to 65% and eventually 100%), a significant oil spill in 2015, and an explosion in 2016 that resulted in two deaths and the permanent shutdown of the upgrader.

In 2018, Nexen announced a $400 million expansion project, which is expected to begin production in late 2020.

== Marketing ==
Nexen also has an Energy Marketing division that trades and markets proprietary and third-party crude oil, natural gas, liquid natural gas, and electrical power.

== See also ==
- CNOOC Limited
- Foreign ownership of companies of Canada
- List of petroleum companies
