= OPTI Canada =

OPTI Canada Inc.
- Company type: Private (subsidiary of CNOOC Limited)
- Industry: Oil and Gasoline
- Founded: 1999
- Headquarters: Calgary, Alberta, Canada
- Key people: Christopher Slubicki (President & CEO)
- Website: www.opticanada.com

OPTI Canada is a Calgary, Alberta based oil sands development company. Established in 1999, its sole project is the Long Lake oil sands project, of which it owns 35%. The remaining 65% is owned by project operator Nexen Inc.

== History ==
OPTI was founded as Ormat Process Technologies Inc. in 1999 by Israeli energy company Ormat Industries, which had developed the OrCrude process in the 1990s. Ormat was approached by Calgary-based Nexen, who sent a delegation to Israel to supervise a test of the process. However, using OrCrude in the oil sands appeared uneconomical to Nexen, who withdrew. Ormat instead contacted Calgary's Suncor Energy, with whom it founded OPTI as a 50-50 venture, with the Nexen delegation's head, Jim Arnold, as its first employee. Suncor's land at Burnt Lake was used by Ormat to build an OrCrude demonstration plant, using oil supplied by Suncor.

However, Suncor soon withdrew from the venture, and Nexen returned to take a 50% stake. In 2004, the OPTI decided to expand Long Lake to commercial-scale, and raised over $1.5 billion of private equity and debt. Also in 2004, OPTI underwent a $300 million initial public offering (IPO). In January 2009 OPTI sold 15% working interest in Long Lake project to Nexen for $735 million, following an 89% drop in share price and increasing expenses. In early 2011 OPTI faced severe liquidity problems and an inability to service its $2.8 billion debt. Its shareprice closed at $0.30 on February 4, 2011, down from a high of $24.85 in 2008. Analysts believed bankruptcy or restructuring of the company was likely.

On November 28, 2011, it was announced the company had been acquired by CNOOC Luxembourg S.à r.l, an indirect wholly owned subsidiary of CNOOC Limited. The total value of the acquisition was approximately US$2.1 billion.

== Long Lake ==
The Long Lake project uses OPTI's proprietary OrCrude process, which produces usable fuel from byproducts of extracted bitumen. This fuel is used to generate steam for bitumen extraction using steam-assisted gravity drainage (SAGD) technology. OrCrude additionally produces hydrogen, which is used for hydrocracking in the refining process.

Typically, natural gas is used to generate steam for SAGD extraction. However, using OrCrude-generated fuel significantly reduces the need for natural gas, reducing OPTI's operating costs by approximately $10 per barrel of oil produced.
