= Katerra =

American technology company 2015-2022

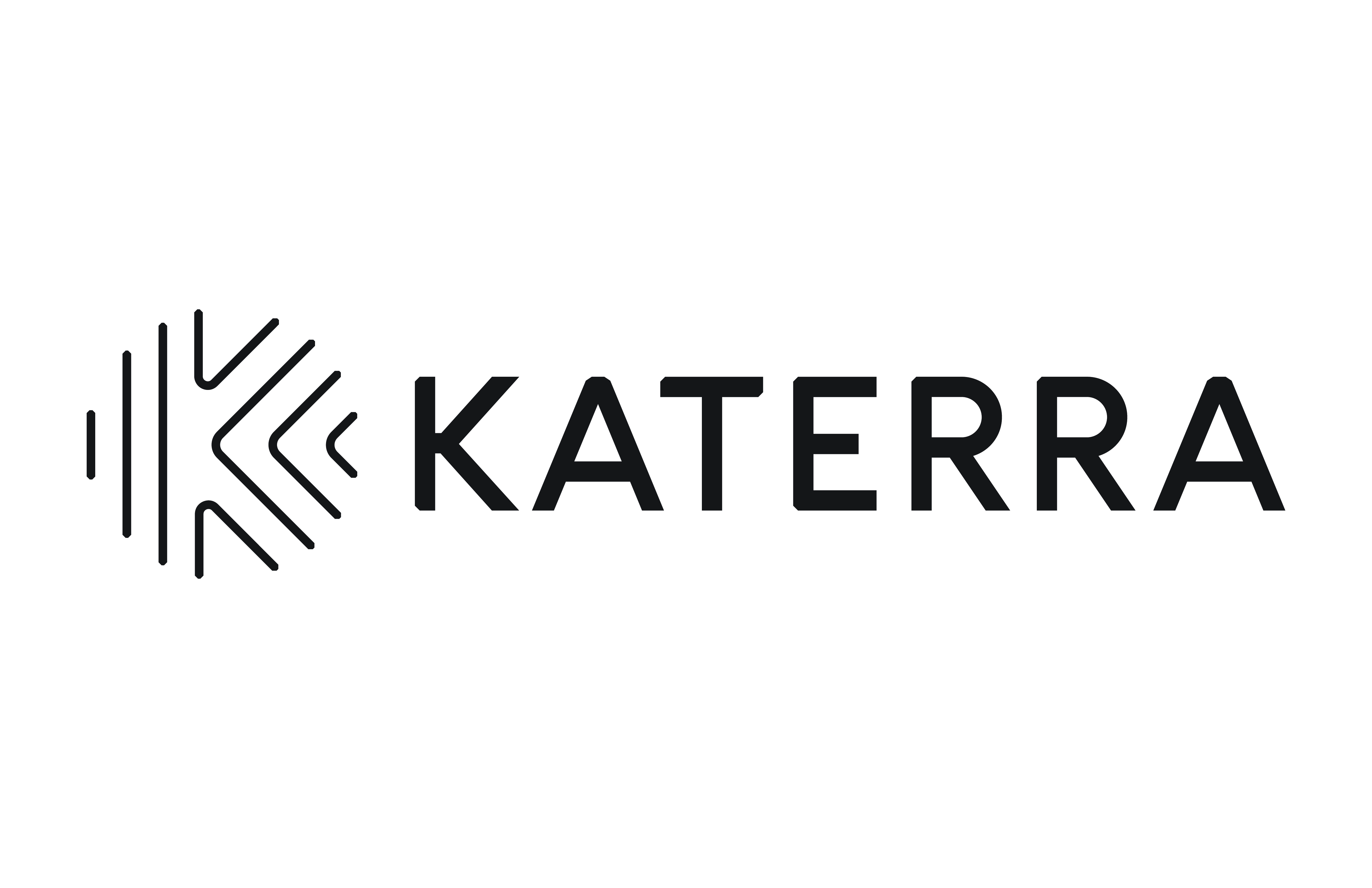
- Company type: Private
- Industry: Construction
- Founded: 2015
- Headquarters: Menlo Park, California, United States
- Key people: Paal Kibsgaard (CEO)
- Revenue: Bankrupt (Under Liquidation)
- Number of employees: 7,500 (2018)
- Website: katerra.com

Katerra was an American technology-driven off-site construction company. It was founded in 2015 by Michael Marks, former CEO of Flextronics and former Tesla interim CEO, along with Fritz Wolff, the executive chairman of The Wolff Co. Katerra was listed on LinkedIn's "Top Startup Companies" to work for in 2017.

In May 2020, it was announced that as a part of an additional $200 million raise, COO and former Schlumberger CEO Paal Kibsgaard would take over from Michael Marks as CEO of Katerra in June. Some of its independent assets in other regions, including the Middle East would continue to exist as independent entity. In June 2021, Katerra announced plans to shut down, laying off remaining employees without paying out earned personal time off or severance.

== History ==
The company was founded in 2015. In January 2018, Katerra took an $835 million investment from Softbank. The investment was made from the Vision Fund.

The company manufactured large building components off-site, particularly for multi-family housing. For example, the company would fabricate an entire wall (including windows) off-site for final assembly on site at a construction project. The technique allowed lower cost and the company claimed higher-quality finishes.

Katerra was known for its use of mass timber construction and its manufacture of mass timber products such as glued laminated timber and cross-laminated timber. In support of this specialty, Katerra purchased MGA in 2018, the leading architectural firm in the field of tall wood buildings and mass timber construction. In many of its projects, the company served as an off-site manufacturer, architect, and on-site contractor. It generally contracted directly with owners.

Katerra used SAP HANA for real-time data and Building Information Modeling (BIM) software such as Revit for building design.

The company had projects ongoing in several states; as of the end of 2018 it had 700 projects underway and many in backlog. It had plans to build up to 14 distribution centers across the country.

In December 2019, Katerra reported the company plans to lay off approximately 200 of the workforce and close their factory in Phoenix, Arizona. The manufacturing was moved to Tracy, California, where the costs were lower and the factory was highly automated.

In June 2021 Katerra filed for bankruptcy, blaming the COVID-19 pandemic as well as an inability to raise new capital following the collapse of its lender, Greensill Capital. Softbank's Vision Fund had reportedly invested more than $2 billion in Katerra in total, including a bailout in December 2020.

== See also ==
WeWork – American coworking provider with similar investments from SoftBank
