= Olivier Le Peuch =

French businessman

- Born: 1963 or 1964 (age 62–63); France
- Education: University of Bordeaux
- Occupation: Businessman
- Title: CEO, Schlumberger
- Term: August 2019-
- Predecessor: Paal Kibsgaard
- Board member of: Schlumberger

Olivier Le Peuch (born 1963/1964) is a French businessman, and the chief executive officer (CEO) of Schlumberger, the world's largest oilfield services company, effective 1 August 2019.

== Early life and education ==
Le Peuch was born and raised in France. He earned a bachelor's degree in electrical engineering, and a master's degree in microelectronics, both from ENSEIRB-MATMECA and University of Bordeaux.

== Career ==
In 1987, Le Peuch joined Schlumberger as an electrical engineer. He has worked for Schlumberger for 32 years (as of July 2019), rising to chief operating officer (COO) in February 2019, before succeeding Paal Kibsgaard as CEO on 1 August 2019.

In 2023, Le Peuch's total compensation from Schlumberger was $17.2 million, representing a CEO-to-median worker pay ratio of 154-to-1.
