= Paal Kibsgaard =

Norwegian petroleum engineer and businessman

- Born: April 1967 (age 59); Ålesund, Norway
- Education: Norwegian Institute of Technology
- Occupation: Businessman
- Known for: former Chairman and CEO, Schlumberger
- Title: CEO, Katerra
- Predecessor: Andrew Gould
- Successor: Olivier Le Peuch
- Spouse: Fadila Kibsgaard
- Children: 2

Paal Kibsgaard (born April 1967) is a Norwegian petroleum engineer and businessman; the former chairman and CEO of Schlumberger, the world's largest oilfield services company.

== Early life ==
He was born in Ålesund, Norway in April 1967.

== Education ==
He qualified as a petroleum engineer with a master's degree from the Norwegian Institute of Technology in 1991.

== Career ==
Kibsgaard started his career with ExxonMobil in 1992, and joined Schlumberger in 1997. He became its CEO in August 2011, succeeding Andrew Gould, who retired as chairman and CEO. To the relief of Schlumberger's employees, he was replaced by Olivier Le Peuch in August 2019. Under his leadership, the company laid off approximately 70,000 employees in less than three years. He continued to receive $2 million annual salary from the company for unspecified services and for agreeing not to work for a rival company.

In 2017, Kibsgaard received $20.8 million in reported pay, which was a 12 percent increase from the previous year.

Kibsgaard retired from Schlumberger in August 2019, and was succeeded as CEO by Olivier Le Peuch, and as chairman by Mark G. Papa.

In 2019, Kibsgaard was hired by Katerra as its COO. He had been serving the company as a board of director since 2016. In June 2020, he became the CEO, succeeding Michael Marks. It was reported that his appointment came with several hundred million in new financing, which Katerra secured from SoftBank Vision Fund.

== Personal life ==
In 2004, he married Fadila Kibsgaard, who is from Algeria. His wife was a doctor and organiser of charity events. They had twin girls in 2008.
