= Mark G. Papa =

American businessman

- Born: 1946 or 1947 (age 78–79)
- Education: University of Pittsburgh; University of Houston
- Occupation: Businessman
- Title: Chairman, Schlumberger
- Term: August 2019-
- Predecessor: Paal Kibsgaard

Mark G. Papa (born 1946/1947) is an American businessman. He is the founder and former chairman and CEO of EOG Resources. On August 1, 2019, he became non-executive chairman of Schlumberger.

== Biography ==
=== Early life ===
Papa graduated from the University of Pittsburgh, where he received a bachelor's degree in Petroleum Engineering in 1968. He went on to receive a master's degree in Business Administration from the University of Houston.

=== Career ===
He started his career at the Belco Petroleum Corporation in 1981. In 1999, he founded EOG Resources, an oil and gas company headquartered in Houston, Texas. He served as its chairman and chief executive officer, and currently serves on its board of directors. Additionally, he serves on the board of directors of Oil States International.

He has served as the chairman of the United States Oil and Gas Association.

== Political life ==
He has supported Republican candidates.
