= Royal Vancouver Yacht Club =

Yacht club in Canada

Coordinates: 43.6746°N 79.3996°W

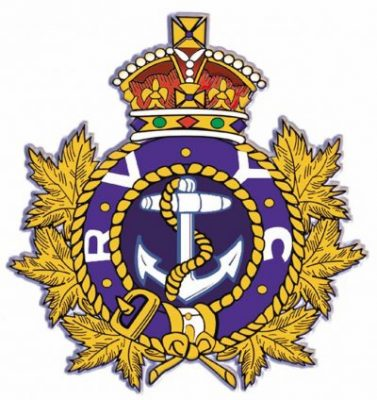

- Burgee
- Nickname: Royal Van
- Short name: RVYC
- Founded: 1903
- Location: 3811 Point Grey Road; Vancouver, British Columbia; V6R 1B3
- Commodore: Donald Vick
- Website: www.royalvan.com

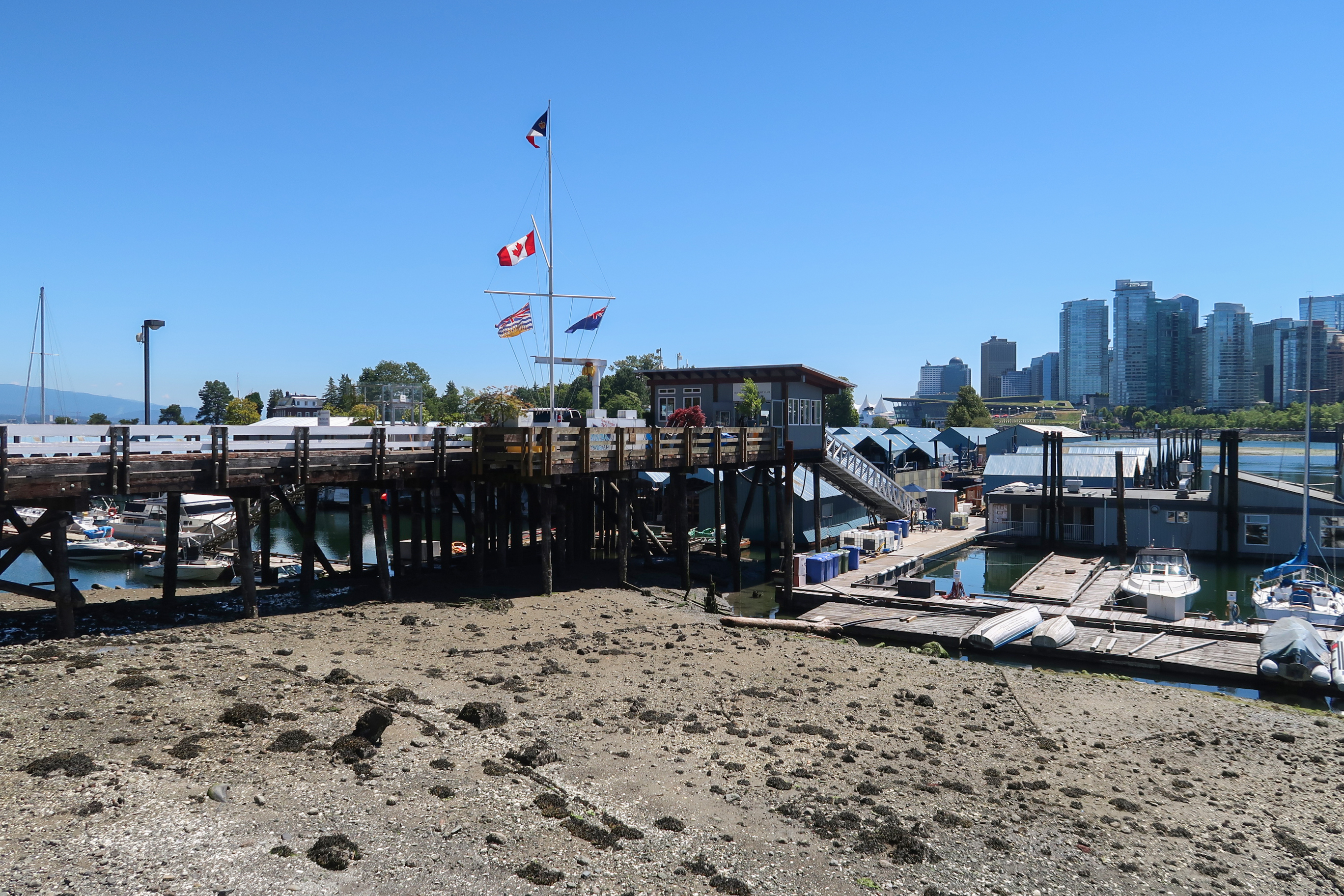
Royal Vancouver Yacht Club Coal Harbour Station

The Royal Vancouver Yacht Club (RVYC) is a yacht club located in Vancouver, British Columbia. Royal Vancouver Yacht Club currently operates two marinas, the one at Jericho Beach in English Bay and another in Coal Harbour. The Jericho site includes a clubhouse, two restaurants, and berths enough for 350 as well as a dinghy dock. In 2017 the award-winning Dock Building was completed, designed by Michael Green Architecture, providing offices for the Harbour Master, instruction and amenity space and workshops to maintain boats, sails, and gear. The Coal Harbour site has approximately 350 berths, some with covered moorage, and is the location of the floating restaurant called The Mermaid Inn. The club also has seven offshore stations in BC waters.

== History ==
The club was founded as the Vancouver Yacht Club in 1903. The club officially became the 'Royal Vancouver Yacht Club' in 1906. J. Kennerly Bryan and his partner Mr. Waterson designed the Royal Vancouver Yacht Club club house in Stanley park (1910). The permanent yacht club located at Jericho Beach was opened 21 years later in 1927. Fred Laughton Townley & Mr. Matheson designed the Royal Vancouver Yacht Club club house on Point Grey Road at Highbury Street in 1926

In 1940–41, the Royal Canadian Navy Reserves scheme for training yacht club members developed the first central registry system.

In 1970, George A Cran edited 'Annals of the Royal Vancouver Yacht Club, 1903–1970' which was condensed and rewritten from records of G.B. Warren, first historian of the club, and the personal recollections of the members of the History Committee, R.V.Y.C., by Norman Hacking.' The Club Annals provides a history of the RVYC's "founding, granting of the Royal Charter, prominent early yachtsmen, racing contests and trophies, officers of the Club, and a general review of sail and power boat activity for sixty-two years in the waters of Burrard Inlet and English Bay, Vancouver, B.C., and Gulf of Georgia, British Columbia, Canada."

In 1986, M. Watson MacCrostie edited 'Annals of the Royal Vancouver Yacht Club, 1971–1985': an updating of the history of Club's members, boats, events and trophies as they appear (or have been amended) in the Year Books, Seabreezes and Annual Reports of the years 1971–1985. The information was taken and rewritten from the records and pictures in the Archives of the Club

In 2003, as part of the club's centennial celebrations, James P Delgado wrote 'Racers and rovers: 100 years of the Royal Vancouver Yacht Club.'

== Traditions ==
The Royal Vancouver Yacht Club has a collection of model yachts. 'My Calliope', for example, designed by naval architect Jack Hargrave was donated to the club on 31 May 2012.

== List of Offshore stations ==
- Tugboat Island, Silva Bay (1960)
- Alexandra Island, Centre Bay (1965)
- Secret Cove, Sunshine Coast (1972)
- Salt Spring Island, Scott Point (1977)
- Wigwam Inn, Indian Arm (1985)
- Garden Bay, Sunshine Coast (1989)
- Cortes Island, Cortes Bay (1993)

== Notable members ==
- Colin Hansen, former provincial politician
- Jimmy Pattison, businessman
- Jason Priestley, actor
- Nardwuar, radio personality
- Andrew Saxton, former federal politician
- Chip Wilson, founder Lululemon
- David Eby, former provincial politician

== See also ==
- List of International Council of Yacht Clubs members

== Notes ==
- 'Annals of the Royal Vancouver Yacht Club, 1903–1965: A history of organized racing and cruising in British Columbia Coastal Waters' (Vancouver, 1965, Royal Vancouver Yacht Club)
- 'Annals of the Royal Vancouver Yacht Club, 1971–1985: A history of organized racing and cruising in British Columbia Coastal Waters' (Vancouver, 1986, Royal Vancouver Yacht Club)
