= Civeo Corporation =

American accommodation services corporation

- Company type: Public
- Traded as: NYSE: CVEO
- Industry: Oil and gas
- Headquarters: Houston, Texas, United States
- Key people: Bradley J. Dodson (Chief Executive Officer & President)
- Revenue: ▲$530 Million(2020)
- Number of employees: 4,000
- Website: Civeo.com

The Civeo Corporation is an American accommodation services multinational corporation. It is a spin-off of Oil States International. It is a public company listed on the New York Stock Exchange.

== History ==
The company is a spin-off from Oil States International, an oil and gas American corporation and public company also listed on the New York Stock Exchange (NYSE).

Its IPO at US$23.23 was on June 2, 2014, when it joined the New York Stock Exchange. It trades as "CVEO". Prior to the transaction, on May 30, 2014, Oil States International shareholders received two shares of Civeo common stock for each Oil States International common stock they held.

== Overview ==
The company is headquartered in Houston, Texas. Its chief executive officer and president is Bradley J. Dodson.

The company provides accommodation services to employees of oil and gas companies in the United States, Canada, and Australia. It owns and operates seventeen lodges and villages in Canada and Australia, with about 21,000 rooms.
