= Saskatchewan Oil & Gas Corporation =

Canadian energy corporation

SaskOil
- Type: Crown corporation (1974-1986); Public company (1986-1997)
- Industry: Oil/natural gas
- Successor: Nexen
- Headquarters: Regina, Saskatchewan, Canada
- Products: Oil/natural gas

Saskatchewan Oil & Gas Corporation, also known as SaskOil, was a Canadian Crown corporation owned by the Government of Saskatchewan from 1973 to 1986, when the company went public under the name Wascana Energy Inc. In 1987, the last remaining government interest in the corporation was sold to Canadian Occidental Petroleum and in 1997 it was bought entirely by Canadian Occidental.

== History ==
Saskatchewan Oil & Gas Corporation, or SaskOil, was established in 1973 by the Government of Saskatchewan as a Crown corporation. It was the first state-owned oil and gas company in North America, founded by Saskatchewan New Democratic Party Premier Allan Blakeney. It was responsible for oil and natural gas exploration, extraction, and marketing in the province of Saskatchewan.

In 1986, Premier Grant Devine from the Progressive Conservative Party of Saskatchewan privatized it by selling the majority of the company to the public. Its name was changed to Wascana Energy Inc and shares were made available on the public markets. In 1987, the last remaining government interest in the corporation was sold to Canadian Occidental Petroleum.

In 1997, Talisman Energy initiated a hostile takeover of Wascana Energy. However, Canadian Occidental (later known as Nexen and now CNOOC International) countered this as a white knight and responded with a higher bid, which was supported by Wascana Energy's board of directors.

== Operations ==
In 1997, Wascana was one of the top three oil and gas producers in Canada, producing 115,000 barrels of oil equivalent in Northern Canada and 264,000 worldwide, with international interests in Venezuela and Algeria.
