= Water injection (oil production) =

Method to increase oil production

In the oil industry, waterflooding or water injection is where water is injected into the oil reservoir, to maintain the pressure (also known as voidage replacement), or to drive oil towards the wells, and thereby increase production. Water injection wells may be located on- and offshore, to increase oil recovery from an existing reservoir.

Normally only 30% of the oil in a reservoir can be extracted, but water injection increases the recovery (known as the recovery factor) and maintains the production rate of a reservoir over a longer period.

Waterflooding began accidentally in Pithole, Pennsylvania by 1865. Waterflooding became common in Pennsylvania in the 1880s.

== Sources of injection water ==
Most sources of bulk water can be used for injection. The following sources of water are used for recovery of oil:

Produced water is often used as an injection fluid. This reduces the potential of causing formation damage due to incompatible fluids, although the risk of scaling or corrosion in injection flowlines or tubing remains. Also, the produced water, being contaminated with hydrocarbons and solids, must be disposed of in some manner, and disposal to sea or river will require clean-up treatment of the water stream first. However, the processing required to render produced water fit for reinjection may be equally costly.

As the volumes of water being produced are never sufficient to replace all the production volumes (oil and gas, in addition to water), additional "make-up" water must be provided. Mixing waters from different sources exacerbates the risk of scaling.

Seawater may be the most convenient source for offshore production facilities, and it may be pumped inshore for use in land fields. Where possible, the water intake is placed at sufficient depth to reduce the concentration of algae; however, filtering, deoxygenation, treatment with a biocide is generally required.

Aquifer water from water-bearing formations other than the oil reservoir, but in the same structure, has the advantage of purity and chemical compatibility where available. However this will not be allowed if the aquifer is a source of potable water as, for instance, in Saudi Arabia.

River water will require filtration and treatment with a biocide before injection.

== Filters ==
Filters clean the water and remove impurities, such as sediments, shells, sand, algae and other biological matter. Typical filtration is to 2 micrometres, but depends on reservoir requirements. After filtration the remaining matter in the filtrate is fine enough to avoid blockage of the pores of the reservoir. Sand filters are a commonly used filtration technology. The sand filter has beds with various sizes of sand granules. The water flows through the first, coarsest, layer of sand down to the finest. To clean the filter the process is inverted. After the water is filtered it continues to the de-oxygenation tower. Sand filters are bulky, heavy, have some spill over of sand particles and require chemicals to enhance water quality. A more sophisticated approach is to use automatic self-cleaning backflushable screen filters (suction scanning).

The importance of proper water treatment is crucial; especially with river-, and seawater, intake water quality can vary significantly (algae blooming in spring, storms and current stirring up sediments from the seafloor) which may have significant impact on the performance of the water treatment facilities. This may result in poor water quality, bioclogging of the reservoir and reduction of oil production.

== De-oxygenation ==
Oxygen must be removed from the water because it promotes corrosion and growth of certain bacteria. Bacterial growth in the reservoir can produce hydrogen sulfide, a source of production problems, and may block the pores in the rock.

A deoxygenation tower brings the injection water into contact with a gas stream (gas is readily available in the oilfield). The filtered water flows down the de-oxygenation tower, splashing onto a series of trays or packing causing dissolved air to be transferred to the gas stream.

An alternative or supplementary method, also used as a backup to deoxygenation towers, is to add an oxygen scavenging agent such as sodium bisulfite and ammonium bisulphite.

Another option is to use membrane contactors. Membrane contactors bring the water into contact with an inert gas stream, such as nitrogen, to strip out dissolved oxygen. Membrane contactors have the advantage of being lower weight and compact enabling smaller system designs.

== Water injection pumps ==
The high pressure, high flow water injection pumps are placed near to the de-oxygenation tower and boosting pumps. They fill the base of the reservoir with the filtered water to push the oil towards the wells like a piston. The result of the injection is not quick, it needs time.

== Water injection plants ==
The configuration of the plant elements described above and their operating conditions are outlined in this section. These examples are the former Amoco North West Hutton installation and the Buzzard installation in the North Sea.

=== North West Hutton ===
The water injection system had two design cases

- Case A – Injection of 100,000 barrels of water per day (BWPD) (662 m^{3}/hr), injection pumps operating in parallel with a discharge pressure of 3,000 psi (207 bar)
- Case B – 60,000/65,000 BWPD (397/431 m^{3}/hr), pumps in series /parallel, discharge pressure is 3,000 psi (207 bar) and 30,000/35,000 BWPD (198/232 m^{3}/hr) with a discharge pressure of 5,000 psi (345 bar)

The two duty seawater lift pumps discharged water at 1,590 m^{3}/hr and 30.5 psi (2.1 barg) to the seawater filters. These comprised six dual media (garnet and anthracite) filter beds. Normal flow was downwards. Backwash flow of water and air was upwards with flush water discharged overboard. Backwashing was initiated by a high differential pressure across a filter bed.

Filtered water was routed to the top of the deaerator. This was a vertical vessel 12.6 m high and 4.0 m diameter, the internals comprise a packed bed. Air was stripped from the water by an upflow of fuel gas, gas/air was routed from the top of the vessel to the flare. Oxygen scavenger was injected into the deaerator vessel to remove any residual oxygen. Deaerated water was drawn from the base of the vessel by the deaerator pumps and was transferred to the cold water header operating at 90 psig (6.2 barg).

Process and utility coolers were supplied from the cold water header, warm water from the coolers was routed to the degassing drum where any air or gas was removed. From the degassing drum water passed to the injection filters.

Water was filtered in the water injection filters, one duty and one on standby/backwash. From the filters water was routed to the water injection pumps.

The three water injection pumps each had a capacity of 221 m^{3}/hr with a differential head of 2068.5 metres (209 bar). The pumps discharged to the 3,000 psi manifold and wellheads. The single water injection booster pump (221 m^{3}/hr, 1,379 m (139 bar) differential head) took its suction from the discharge of the water injection pumps and discharged to the 5,000 psi (345 bar) manifold and wellheads.

There were eight water injection wells, each well had a capacity of 15,000 BWPD (99.4 m^{3}/hr).

=== Buzzard ===
An alternative configuration and technology is used on the Buzzard field in the North Sea. Seawater lift pumps deliver 4,000m^{3}/hr at 12 barg to the seawater coarse filtration package. After filtration the water is used to cool the cooling medium in the cooling medium plate exchangers. 2322.7 m^{3}/hr of seawater now at 6 barg and 20°C is routed to the fine filters and then to the sulphate removal membrane where reverse osmosis is used to remove sulphate ions from the water.

Desulphated water flows to the top of the deaerator column, this operates at a partial vacuum (0.3 bara) sustained by the deaerator vacuum unit. The deaerator internals comprise three packed beds. Deaerated water is taken from the base of the deaerator by transfer pumps which deliver 1632 m^{3}/hr at 3.6 barg to the degasser surge drum. From the surge drum water is transferred to the water injection pumps which deliver water at up to 250,000 BWPD to up to 11 water injection wells.

Produced water is also injected into the reservoir at up to 350,000 BWPD.

== Water injection wells ==
The table shows the number of water injection wells on a selection of offshore installations mainly in the North Sea.

Installation	Location	No. of water injection wells	Installation	Location	No. of water injection wells
Brent C	North Sea	9	Namorado I	South America	3
Claymore A	North Sea	10	Namorado II	South America	11
Cormorant A	North Sea	18	Cherne I	South America	5
Statfjord A	North Sea	6	Eider	North Sea	7
Murchison	North Sea	10	Nelson	North Sea	9
Magnus	North Sea	5	Tiffany	North Sea	7
Brae A	North Sea	14	N W Hutton	North Sea	8

== Sources and notes ==
- "New Billions In Oil" Popular Mechanics, March 1933—i.e. article on invention of water injection for oil recovery
- Water injection
- Waterflood Performance Predictive Calculations
