= Natalie Telewiak =

Canadian architect

Natalie Telewiak AIBC, M.Arch., LEED AP is a Canadian architect.

== Education ==
Graduating from McGill University's engineering program before completing a Master of Architecture at University of British Columbia.

== Career ==
She worked for Mcfarlane Green Biggar Architecture + Design before joining Michael Green Architecture (MGA), which she leads with firm partner Michael Green.

Telewiak is an advocate for the sustainable and healthy benefits of building with wood. She has led the MGA team to design and build some of the most significant timber buildings in the world including Ronald McDonald House BC (Vancouver, BC, c2014), a first example of tilt-up CLT/light wood-frame construction, the innovative and award-winning Oregon State University Forest Science Complex (Corvallis, Oregon 2020), a mass timber, multi-activity centre in Gallivare, Sweden, as well as Google's new Mass Timber Complex (Sunnyvale, CA, under construction).

== Recognition ==
Aside from four Governor General's Medals, two RAIC Innovation Awards, and the American Institute of Architects Innovation Award, the Royal Architectural Institute of Canada (RAIC) recognized MGA with the 2021 Architecture Firm Award and Architizer Magazine named MGA the Best Firm in North America in their 2021 A+ Awards.
