= Long Lake (oil sands) =

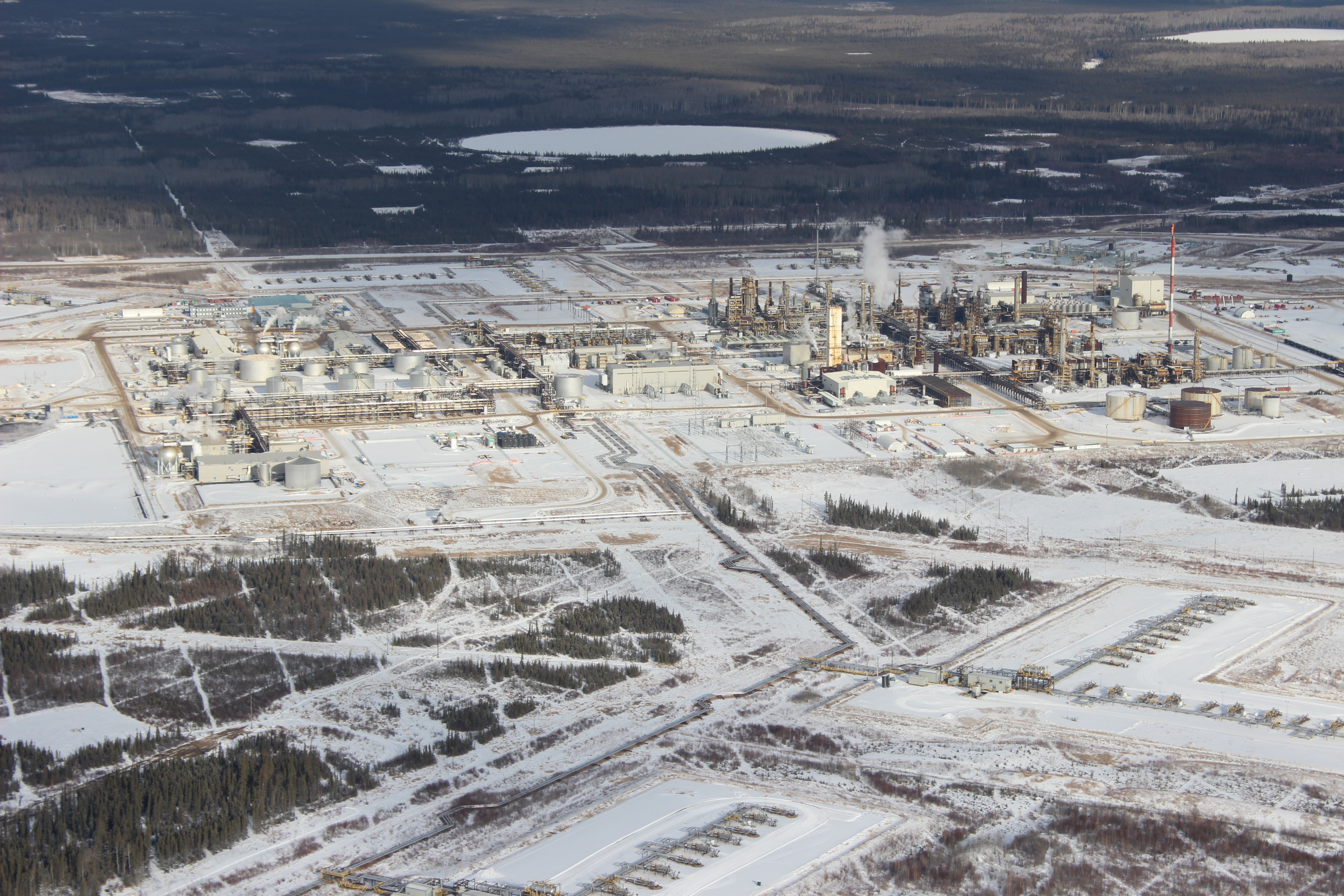
Aerial photograph of the industrial buildings at Long Lake

The Long Lake oil sands upgrader project is an in situ oil extraction project near Anzac, Alberta, 40 km (25 mi) southeast of Fort McMurray in the Athabasca oil sands region of Alberta.

The project is owned and operated by CNOOC Petroleum North America, formerly known as Nexen.

Long Lake is an integrated steam-assisted gravity drainage (SAGD) site which produced 41,000 barrels per day (6,500 m^{3}/d) of bitumen in 2017. The project used proprietary OrCrude technology as well as hydrocracking and gasification to produce Premium Synthetic Crude (PSC) oil, with a production capacity of approximately 58,500 barrels per day (9,300 m^{3}/d), however the upgrader was shut down following a 2016 explosion.

== History ==
=== Development ===
In 2001, Nexen formed a joint venture with OPTI Canada Inc. (OPTI) to develop the Long Lake lease using SAGD for in-situ bitumen production and OrCrude technology to upgrade the bitumen to PSC.

The first phase of the project received regulatory approval in 2003 and was sanctioned in 2004. Construction at the site began in 2004. Steam injection began in 2007 and the first production was in 2008.

SAGD bitumen operations at Long Lake started in mid-2008 and production of PSC from the upgrader began in 2009. Early in 2009, Nexen acquired an additional 15% interest in the Long Lake project, increasing the company's ownership level to 65%. Following this acquisition, Nexen became responsible for operating the entire project.

There have been some technical problems and the project has failed to meet production projections. As of early 2011, the site was producing about 30,000 barrels per day (4,800 m^{3}/d) and OPTI was struggling under a heavy debt load and lack of liquidity. On February 1, 2011, OPTI appointed Lazard Freres & Co., a bankruptcy specialist, raising speculation that restructuring or bankruptcy for the company was imminent. In 2011, CNOOC Limited acquired OPTI, which included the 35% non-operated interest in the Long Lake project and joint venture lands.

On February 25, 2013, Nexen was acquired by CNOOC Limited.

=== 2013 Alberta floods ===
Enbridge Pipelines (Athabasca) Inc., a subsidiary of Enbridge Inc., (TSX:ENB) (NYSE:ENB) reported a pipeline leak site, about 70 kilometres southeast of Fort McMurray, near its Cheetham terminal on June 22, 2013, of approximately 750 barrels of Light Synthetic Crude oil from CNOOC's Long Lake upgrader SAGD project that spilled into a wetland area near Anzac. Unusually heavy rainfall in the region may have caused "ground movement on the right-of way that may have impacted the pipeline." Operations between Hardisty and Cheecham were restored on June 23 when Enbridge's Athabasca pipeline (Line 19) was safely restarted.

=== 2015 oil spill ===
On July 15, 2015, a pipeline oil spill at the facility was discovered by a worker in the afternoon which the factory's failsafe system was unable to detect. As of July 16, 2015, at least 5,000,000 litres (1,100,000 imp gal; 1,300,000 US gal)—or 31,500 barrels—of oil emulsion has been spilt onto an area of approximately 16,000 square metres (170,000 sq ft), The company said efforts were made to stabilise the leak, such as shutting down operations at the time of discovery and isolating the area. The company said the pipeline was installed in 2014 and contains an emulsion mixture of bitumen, wastewater, and oil sand. Determining the cause of the spill would take months, according to a company employee.

Efforts were made to clean up the affected area, such as vacuum trucks, and avoid further environmental impact, like affecting wildlife. On July 19, one duck was found dead from the spill.

The facility resumed operations by September 2015, but 45 pipelines remained shut down at that time.

Investigations concluded that the subsurface pipeline ruptured in the muskeg due to improper design on June 15, but remained undetected by detection systems for a month until being discovered by workers. Nexen was fined $750,000 for the spill.

=== 2016 explosion ===
On January 16, 2016, an explosion occurred in the hydrocracker unit killing Drew Foster, 52, and injuring Dave Williams, 28, who succumbed to his injuries January 25. In 2019, Nexen (by then known as CNOOC Petroleum North America) pleaded guilty to charges resulting from the incident and was fined $450,000.

=== Recent history ===
In 2018, Nexen announced a $400 million expansion project, which is expected to begin production in late 2020.

== Process ==
The Long Lake project uses SAGD to extract bitumen from the underground oil sands. The process involves using two separate horizontal wells into the reservoir. One well is used to inject steam, which reduces the viscosity of the bitumen. The previously stable bitumen then drains into the second well, which extracts it to the surface.

The Long Lake upgrader used OPTI's OrCrude process, which refines by-products of the extracted bitumen into usable fuel, which is used to generate steam. This process also generates hydrogen, which fuels the refinement of extracted bitumen through hydrocracking. The upgrader was idled and then permanently closed following the 2016 hydrocracker explosion.

== Infrastructure ==
The Long Lake (oil sands) upgrader is linked with the Enbridge Athabaska Pipeline (Line 37), a 17-kilometre-long, 12-inch diameter pipe from Long Lake to Cheecham terminal. Enbridge's 540-kilometre Athabasca (Line 19) from Cheecham to Hardisty, a major part of the network that serves Alberta's oil sands, "can carry up to 570,000 barrels per day of crude from the Athabasca and Cold Lake regions to Hardisty, Alta., a major pipeline hub in eastern Alberta, about 200 kilometres southeast of Edmonton."

=== Anzac (Long Lake) Heliport ===
Anzac (Long Lake) Heliport
- IATA: none; ICAO: none; TC LID: CNZ2

Summary
- Airport type: Private
- Owner/Operator: Nexen
- Location: Anzac
- Time zone: Alberta Time (UTC−06:00)
- Elevation AMSL: 1,612 ft / 491 m
- Coordinates: 56°25′27″N 110°57′52″W

Map
- Location in Alberta

Helipads
Number	Length		Surface
Number	ft	m	Surface
1	76 × 101	23 × 31	Asphalt
- Source: Canada Flight Supplement

The Anzac (Long Lake) Heliport is located on the Long Lake site.
