= Montrose oil field =

UK offshore crude oil field

- Location within North Sea
- Country: United Kingdom
- Region: Central North Sea
- Location/blocks: Blocks 22/17 and 22/18
- Offshore/onshore: Offshore
- Coordinates: 57°27′02″N 01°23′16″E
- Operator: see text
- Owner: see text

Field history
- Discovery: 1971
- Start of production: 1976
- Peak year: 1979

Production
- Peak of production (oil): 28,700 barrels per day (~1.4×10^{6} t/a)
- Recoverable oil: 86.4 million barrels (~1.1×10^{7} t)
- Producing formations: Palaeocene Sandstone

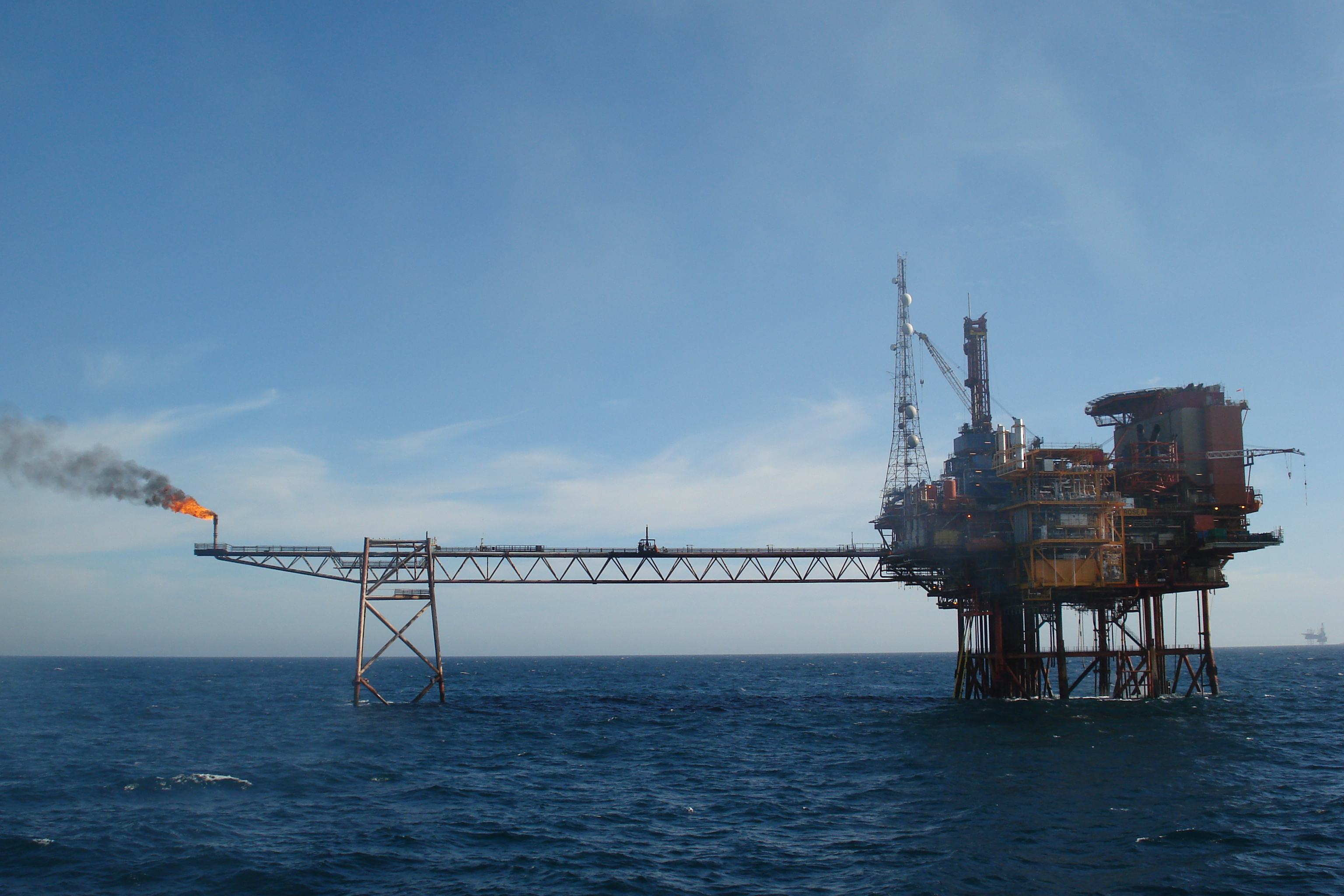
Montrose Alpha oil production platform

The Montrose oil field is a significant crude oil producing field in the UK sector of the central North Sea, 210 km east of Aberdeen. Production of oil started in 1976 and a major upgrade in 2016 extended the field life to beyond 2030.

== The field ==
The Montrose oil field is located in Blocks 22/17 and 22/18 of the UK North Sea. It is named after the Scottish east coast town of Montrose. The field was discovered in November 1971 and is a Palaeocene sandstone at a depth of 8,000 feet (2,438 m). The reservoir has the following characteristics:

Montrose reservoir
Parameter	Value
API gravity	38.5-40°
Gas Oil Ratio	600-700 scf/bbl
Porosity	22.8%
Permeability	39.3 md
Pressure	3,750 psi at 8,150 TVDSS
Sulfur	0.23%
Recoverable reserves	86.4 million barrels 12.8 million tonnes

=== Owners and operators ===
The field was originally licensed to a joint venture comprising Amoco UK Petroleum Limited (30.77%), Enterprise Oil plc (30.77%), Amerada Hess Exploration Ltd (23.00%), and Texas Eastern (UK) Ltd (15.38%). The field was originally operated by Amoco (UK) Exploration Company. Ownership of the Montrose field passed from Amoco to BP to Paladin Resources, until Talisman Energy took over in 2012 and most recently Repsol bought the assets in joint ownership with Sinopec. In late 2023 Sinopec sold their share to Repsol who became sole operator. In 2025 Repsol merged their UK interests with that of Neo Energy to create the operator Neo Next.

== Development ==
The field was developed by a single integrated production platform Montrose Alpha (or Montrose A). Oil was initially exported through a pair of CALM buoys located 1.7 km from the platform. In 1982 a 48 km 14-inch oil pipeline from Montrose to Forties Charlie was commissioned which provided an oil export route.

Montrose field infrastructure
Installation	Montrose A	Montrose bridge linked platform	CALM buoys
Coordinates	57°27'02"N 01°23'16"E		
Water depth, metres	88	88	91
Fabrication	UIE Cherbourg and St. Wandrille	Heerema Fabrication, Zwijndrecht Netherlands	Earl Wright Newcastle
Topside weight, tonnes	14,000	10,500	
Function	Drilling, production, accommodation	Process and utilities	Offloading oil
Accommodation	96	–	–
Type	Steel jacket	Steel jacket	Catenary anchor leg
Legs	8	4	–
Piles	32	6	–
Well slots	24	–	–
Throughput oil, bpd	60,000	40,000	60,000
Oil storage capacity, barrels	Nil	Nil	–
Installed	1975	2016	1975
Production start	June 1976	2016	1976
Oil production to	CALM buoys Forties Charlie 48 km 14-inch	Montrose A (bridge)	Tankers 72,000 dwt
Gas production to	Flare	Montrose A (bridge)	–

=== Production ===
The original processing plant on Montrose A had a nominal capacity of 60,000 barrels of oil per day. Water injection was 55,000 barrels per day. There were 16 production wellheads, and 4 water injection wells.

Production of oil (in 1000s barrels)

There were two Catenary Anchor Leg Mooring (CALM) buoys in 91 metres of water. They were used from 1976 to 1984 to load tankers. They were decommissioned in 1984 when the 48 km 14-inch oil export line from Montrose to Forties Charlie was commissioned.

Montrose was a 'stranded asset' with no nearby export route for gas, the gas was therefore flared. A horizontal 455 feet (139 m) long flare bridge was installed between the platform and the flare (57.451336N 1.390825E). The bridge was supported by a tripod jacket.

=== Redevelopment ===
In 1990, Amoco modified the Montrose A processing equipment to receive oil from the then new Arbroath field integrated drilling and production platform. The discovery of the Wood oil field entailed the installation of the Wood and Gas Export (WaGE) processing and compression module on Montrose A and a new 6-inch pipeline delivered gas into the CATS offshore pipeline on Arbroath.

Three new fields – Godwin, Cayley and Shaw – were discovered in the Montrose area. Additional process facilities were required to develop these fields. Details of the field were as follows:

Name	Block	Discovered	Location	Water depth	Developed	Start-up
Cayley	22/17	2007	10 km west of Montrose	91 m	2 subsea production	June 2017
Shaw	22/22	2009	17 km north of Montrose		3 subsea production, 2 injection	May 2017
Wood	22/18	1996	10 km south east of Montrose	92 m	1 subsea well	December 2007

A new platform was installed adjacent to Montrose A in 2016. This was known as the bridge-linked platform and provided additional process and plant support facilities. Production increased to 40,000 boe (barrels of oil equivalent) per day.
