= Oil States International =

Oil States International, Inc.
- Company type: Public
- Traded as: NYSE: OIS
- Industry: Oil and gas
- Headquarters: Three Allen Center, Suite 4620, Houston, Texas, 77002, United States
- Key people: Stephen A. Wells (Chairman); Cindy B. Taylor (Chief Executive Officer and President)
- Website: oilstatesintl.com

Oil States International, Inc. is an American multinational corporation. It focuses on providing services to oil and gas companies. It is a public company listed on the New York Stock Exchange.

== History ==
The company was founded as an oilfield supply store in Tulsa, Oklahoma in 1937. Five years later, in 1942, it started selling rubber components to oil patch producers in Texas. In the 1950s, it sold rubber products used to support bridges. Later, in the 1970s, it focused on addressing the needs of oil and gas companies in Canada and on the Gulf Coast of the United States. The next decade, in the 1980s, it focused on supplying those companies with pipeline maintenance and repair for their underwater operations at sea. In 1999, it acquired Tubular Services, thus becoming one of the main tubular distributors in the US.

Its IPO was in 2001, when it became a public company on the New York Stock Exchange traded as OIS.

From 2005, it acquired several accommodation inns for employees of oil and gas companies in Canada (Fort McMurray, Northern Alberta, Southern Saskatchewan) and Australia (Gladstone, Queensland, Karratha, Western Australia, Gunnedah Basin in New South Wales). On June 2, 2014, these accommodation services became a spin-off company called Civeo Corporation, also traded on the New York Stock Exchange.

== Board of directors ==
- Stephen A. Wells (Chairman).
- Cindy B. Taylor (Chief Executive Officer and President).
- Lawrence R. Dickerson.
- S. James Nelson.
- Mark G. Papa.
- Gary L. Rosenthal.
- Christopher T. Seaver.
- William T. Van Kleef.
- Thomas "Toots" McScoots.
