= Stub-girder system =

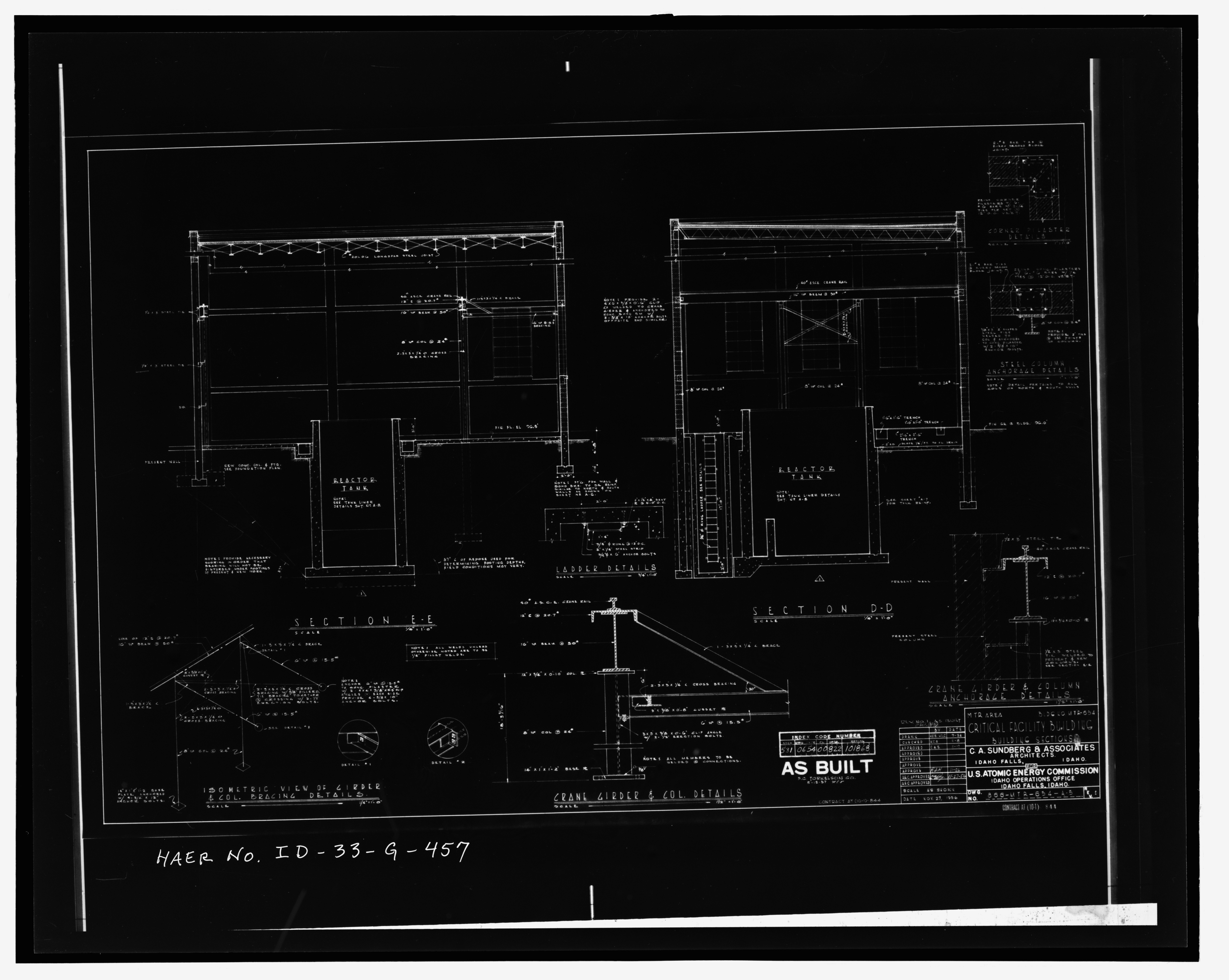
Sections show crane girder, tank below ground level, and five-foot pocket for storing "warm" reactor parts. c.a. sundberg and associates

A stub-girder system (or stub girder system) is a model of steel frame structures consisting of beams and decking, originally developed in the early 1970s in part by Joseph Colaco of Ellisor Engineers Inc.

== Introduction ==
Stub girder systems are a relatively common system in steel modern steel buildings, although they are rarely used anymore, they were very prevalent for a long span of time from the early 70s to the 80s. Though they are not really used anymore due to being uneconomical they are still very common and a lot of times when renovating the flooring in a tall steel building they will have to tear down stud girder systems.

== Design and Components ==
There are four main parts of a stub girder system, being the stubs, steel beams, concrete slab and the shear connectors.

=== Stub ===
This is the namesake of the stub girder system, and it is a short and thick metal beam that sits between the concrete slab and the metal beams. It is welded to the metal beams and connected to the concrete slab with shear connectors. This mostly helps create the strong connection between the steel beams that support the floor and the concrete slab which helps with shock resistance.

=== Steel Beams ===
There are two types of steel beams that are used in the stub girder system, there are the main steel beams that connect to the stubs, and they run parallel to the stubs. This is the beam that connects to the stub to help keep that structurally supported. There are also secondary beams that help to keep the concrete slab and floor from drooping and these beams sit on top of the main beams, which causes them to sit on the same level as the stubs but run perpendicular to the stubs. This also helps the floor have as few weak points as possible to keep the structure sound.

=== Concrete Slab ===
This is the part of the system that lies right on top of the stubs and the secondary steel beams. These are not always concrete with a lot of them being made from a composite that has a similar structure to that of concrete. Usually this will not be the final layer with possibly some metal on top of it or a more decorative material like tile or carpet on top of it to make the room more hospitable. These slabs also help to be a barrier between the steps and weight of the room and objects in the room from warping the metal beams over time because they can absorb some of the force and impact.

=== Shear Connectors ===
These are what connect the stub and secondary beams to the concrete slab because these connectors do not weaken the structure of the concrete slabs like bolts might. These are very important because if they are not used properly or connected properly then the floor might shift which could cause some serious problems in time.

== Advantages and Disadvantages ==
=== Advantages ===
Stud girder systems are strong and structurally sound, with there being many beams to ensure that it does not collapse and different checks for structure like the use of both concrete and metal to give the structure a lot of load capacity but also helps to reduce impact with the concrete. The stud girder system also is light compared to alternate floor systems which allows the building to be a lot lighter compared to others that use different systems. One last advantage is that there is a lot of room for mechanical and electrical systems in the building like air conditioning or heating and things like electrical. This makes installing these systems much simpler and thus less expensive in the long run.

=== Disadvantages ===
Stud girder systems are expensive to use because of the amount of metal required to build them, especially if you are using steel for the beams and the girders. The stud girder systems are also complicated to set up which causes it to take much longer compared to other systems. This causes construction to cost more in the long term not even counting the expensive material cost.

== Applications ==
The main application for this system is in tall buildings with many stories or in buildings with large floors because the concrete slabs are cheap to install in large areas. The large load also allows the floor to carry a lot of different items or appliances.
