= EOG Resources =

American energy company engaged in hydrocarbon exploration

EOG Resources, Inc.
- Type: Public
- Traded as: NYSE: EOG; S&P 500 component
- Industry: Petroleum industry
- Founded: 1999; 27 years ago
- Founder: Mark G. Papa
- Headquarters: Heritage Plaza; Houston, Texas, U.S.
- Key people: Ezra Y. Yacob (CEO & director); Ann D. Janssen (CFO)
- Products: Petroleum; Natural gas; Natural gas liquids
- Production output: 1,232 thousand barrels of oil equivalent (7,540,000 GJ) per day (2025)
- Revenue: ▼$22.632 billion (2025)
- Operating income: ▼$6.385 billion (2025)
- Net income: ▼$4.980 billion (2025)
- Total assets: ▲$51.799 billion (2025)
- Total equity: ▲$29.833 billion (2025)
- Number of employees: 3,400 (2025)
- Website: www.eogresources.com

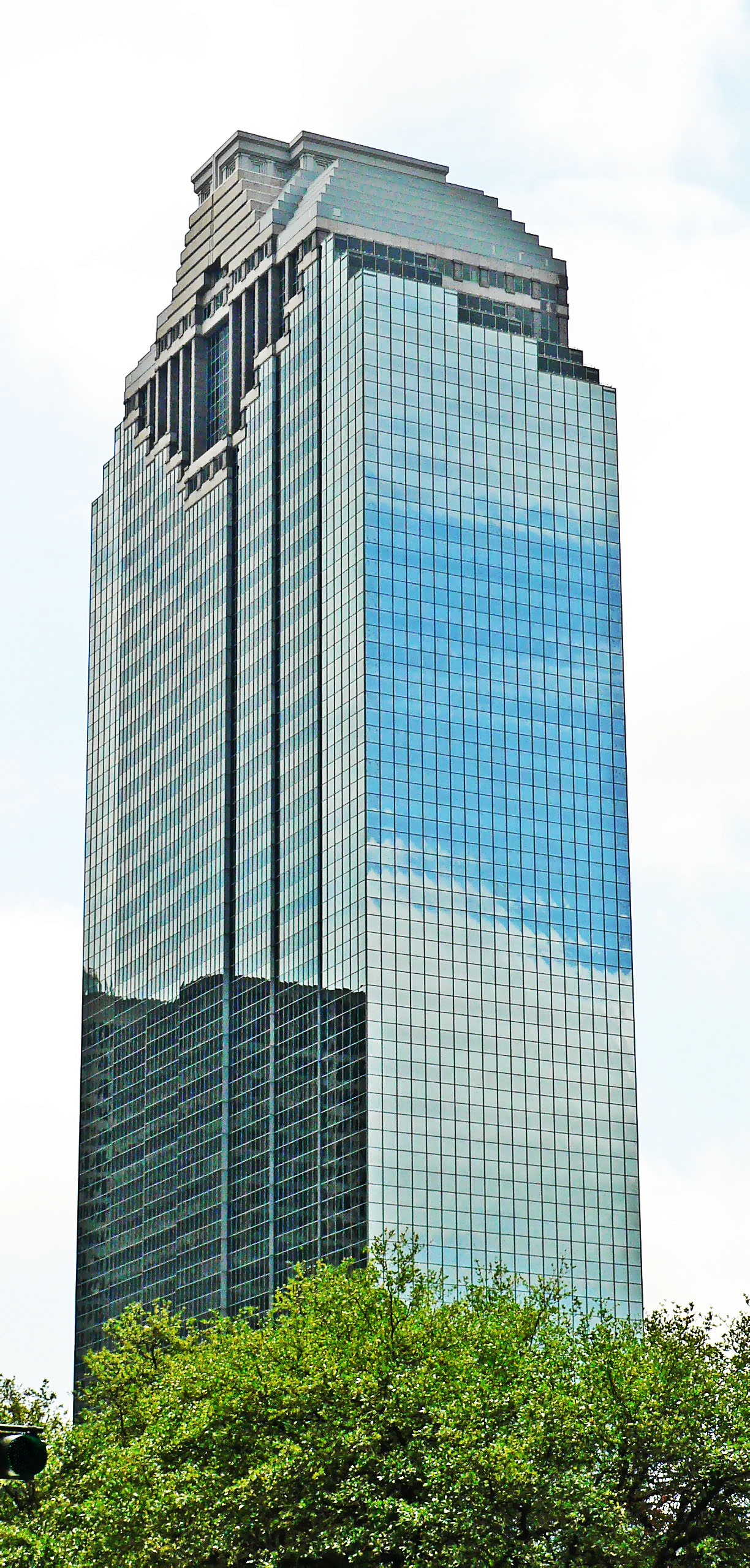
Heritage Plaza in Houston, Texas, the headquarters of EOG Resources

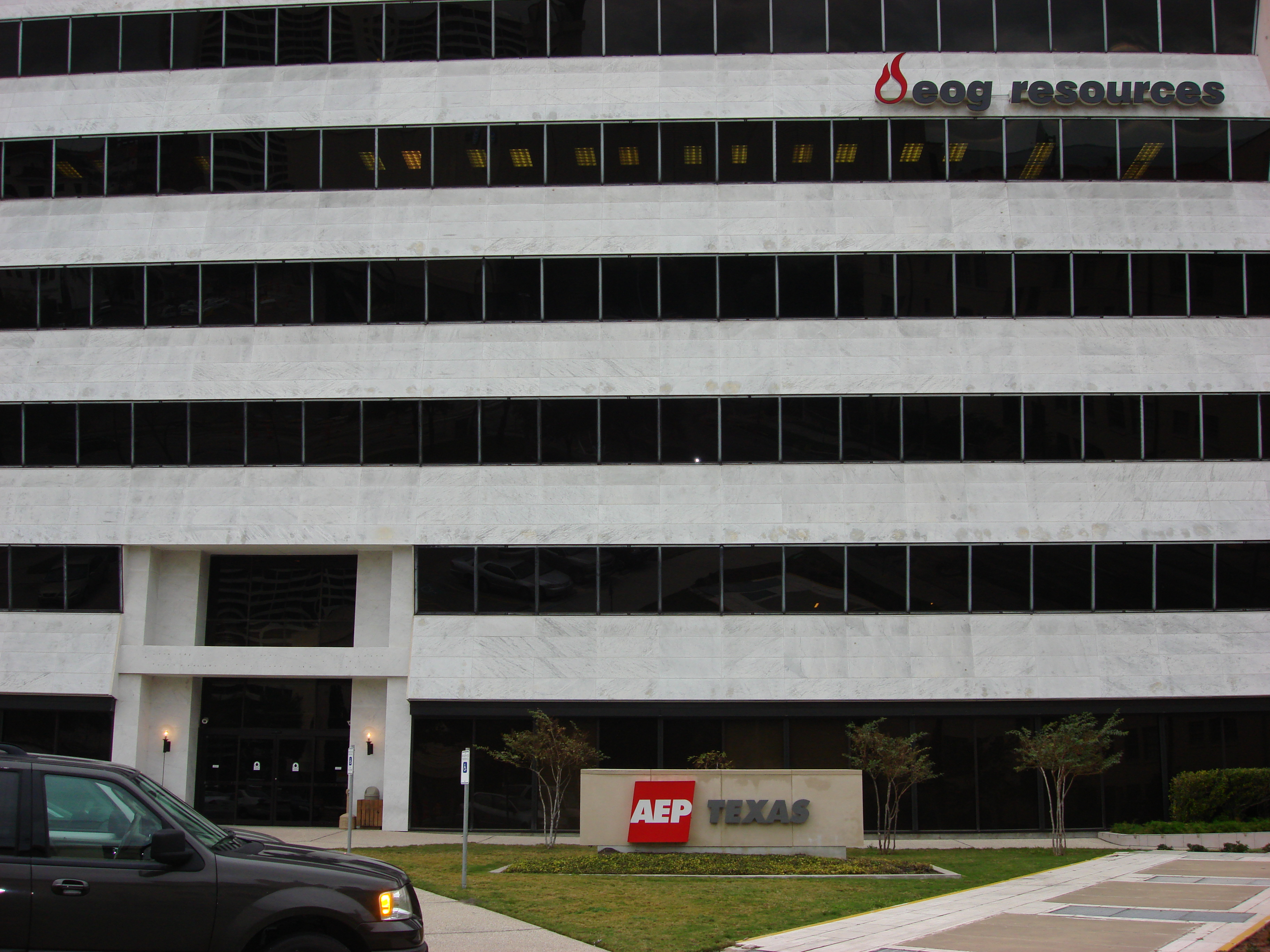
EOG Office - Corpus Christi Division.

EOG Resources, Inc. is an American energy company engaged in hydrocarbon exploration. It is organized in Delaware and headquartered in the Heritage Plaza building in Houston, Texas.

The company is ranked 201st on the Fortune 500 and 310th on the Forbes Global 2000.

The company was named Enron Oil & Gas Company before its separation from Enron in 1999.

As of December 31, 2025, the company had 5.514 billion barrels of oil equivalent (3.373×10^{10} GJ) of estimated proved reserves, of which 98% was in the United States, 2% was in Trinidad and Tobago, and a negligible amount was in Canada and China. The reserves were 35% petroleum, 27% natural gas liquids, and 38% natural gas. In 2020, the company's production averaged 1,232 thousand barrels of oil equivalent (7,540,000 GJ) per day, of which 97% was in the United States, 3% was in Trinidad and Tobago, and a negligible amount was in other areas.

The company is the largest petroleum producer in the Eagle Ford Group. The company also owns properties in the Delaware Basin and other areas of the Permian Basin, including the Leonard, Wolfcamp, and Second Bone Spring Sand shale plays. In the Rocky Mountains, the company owns properties in the Williston Basin of the Bakken Formation and the Turner, Parkman and Niobrara Formations in the Powder River Basin. The company also owns properties in the Austin Chalk, Anadarko Basin, the Fort Worth Basin, and the Marcellus Shale. The company also has acreage in the Horn River Formation in Canada.

== History ==
In 1998, Mark G. Papa was named chairman and chief executive officer. In 1999, the company became independent from Enron and changed its name to EOG Resources, Inc.

In 2000, the company swapped properties with Occidental Petroleum. EOG received properties in East Texas and the Oklahoma Panhandle in exchange for properties in California and the Gulf of Mexico. In February 2000, the company also swapped properties with Burlington Resources. EOG received properties in West Texas and the New Mexico, specifically in the Permian Basin, in exchange for properties in Texas and Oklahoma.

The company acquired properties in Canada from Husky Energy for $320 million in 2003.

In 2006, the company signed a 225,648 square feet (20,963.4 m^{2}) lease for office space in the Heritage Plaza building in Houston, Texas.

In 2008, the company acquired assets in the Chuan Zhong Block exploration area in the Sichuan Basin, Sichuan Province, China from ConocoPhillips.

The company announced major discoveries in 2010 in the Eagle Ford Group.

In May 2011, the company sold gas-producing properties in South Texas and New Mexico for $637 million.

In December 2014, the company sold its assets in Canada. Also in December 2014, founder Mark G. Papa resigned from the board of directors.

In November 2015, the company spent $368 million to acquire additional acreage in the Delaware Basin.

In September 2016, the company acquired Yates Petroleum for 26 million shares of common stock valued at $2.3 billion and $37 million in cash. The acquisition increased the company's holdings by 176,000 net acres in the Delaware Basin, 200,000 net acres in the Powder River Basin, and 138,000 net acres on the Northwest Shelf in New Mexico.

In 2017, the company formed a joint venture with The Carlyle Group to develop oil and gas assets in Ellis County, Oklahoma.

In September 2018, the company sold its offshore assets in the United Kingdom.

In January 2024, a class action lawsuit was filed accusing EOG, along with seven other US oil and gas producers, of an illegal price-fixing scheme to constrain production of shale oil used to produce gasoline, allegedly leading to drivers in the US paying more for gasoline than they would have in a competitive market.

In August 2025, the company acquired Encino for $5.6 billion, adding to its assets in the Permian Basin and Eagle Ford Group.

In February 2026, the company sold its Dean position in the northern Midland Basin for $165 million.
