= Heritage Plaza =

Skyscraper in Houston, Texas

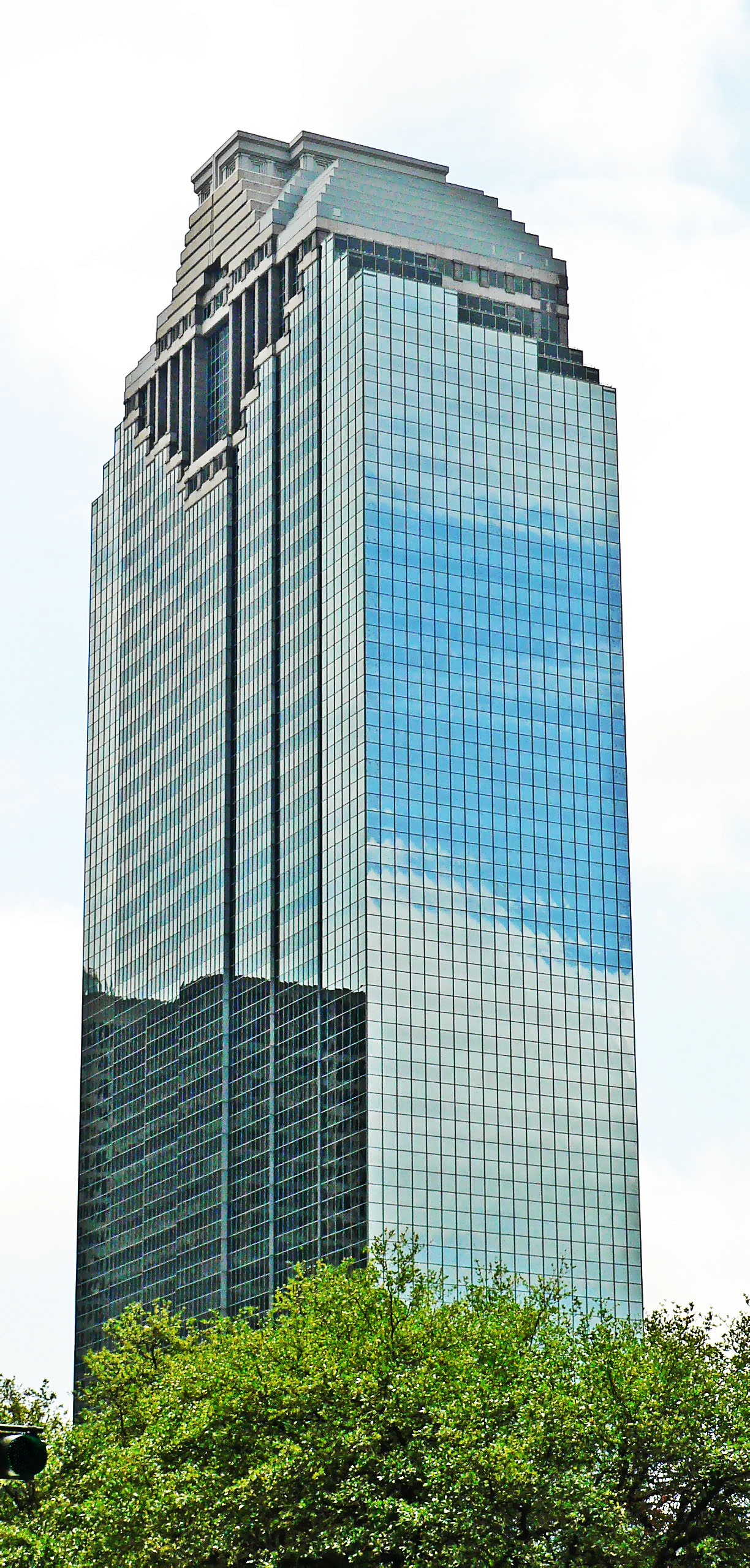
- Interactive map of the Heritage Plaza area

General information
- Status: Completed
- Type: Office, restaurant
- Architectural style: postmodernism
- Location: 1111 Bagby Street, Houston, Texas, U.S.
- Coordinates: 29.75861°N 95.37055°W
- Completed: 1986; 40 years ago
- Opened: 1987
- Cost: $250 million

Height
- Roof: 762 ft (232 m)

Technical details
- Floor count: 53
- Floor area: 1,149,596 sq ft (106,801.0 m^{2})

Design and construction
- Architect: M. Nasr & Partners
- Developer: Clarion Realty Services

Website
- www.brookfieldproperties.com/en/our-properties/heritage-plaza-313.html

Heritage Plaza is a postmodern skyscraper located in the Skyline District of downtown Houston, Texas. Standing at 762 feet (232 m), the tower is the 5th-tallest building in Houston, the 8th-tallest in Texas, and the 60th-tallest in the United States. The building, designed by Houston-based M. Nasr & Partners P.C., was completed in 1987, and has 53 floors.

== History ==
Heritage Plaza completed construction in early 1987. It was the last major office building completed in downtown Houston in the midst of the collapse of the Texas real estate, banking, and oil industries in the 1980s. The building stood as the most recently completed major skyscraper in Houston for nearly 15 years, until the completion of 1500 Louisiana Street in 2002.

The building has 1,150,000 square feet (107,000 m^{2}) of leaseable space, of which a vast majority sat vacant until Texaco leased 550,000 square feet (51,000 m^{2}) in 1989. The building went on to serve as the US headquarters of Texaco for 12 years. In 2001, Heritage Plaza became the US headquarters of the ChevronTexaco corporation.

In 2005, Goddard Investment Group acquired the building. During that year, over 700,000 square feet (65,000 m^{2}) in the building was unoccupied. In 2006, EOG Resources announced that it would move from 3 Allen Center to Heritage Plaza. The firm had signed a 15-year lease for 200,000 square feet (19,000 m^{2}) and planned to move around 400 employees. The firm, scheduled to move in early 2007, became the largest tenant in the building at the time.

In early 2007, Deloitte & Touche USA L.L.P. executed a lease to occupy 300,000 square feet (28,000 m^{2}) as part of a 12-year, 10-floor lease with options to increase that space, if needed. The new lease consolidated staff from three Houston sites to one downtown location, making Deloitte the largest tenant in Heritage Plaza.

== Design ==
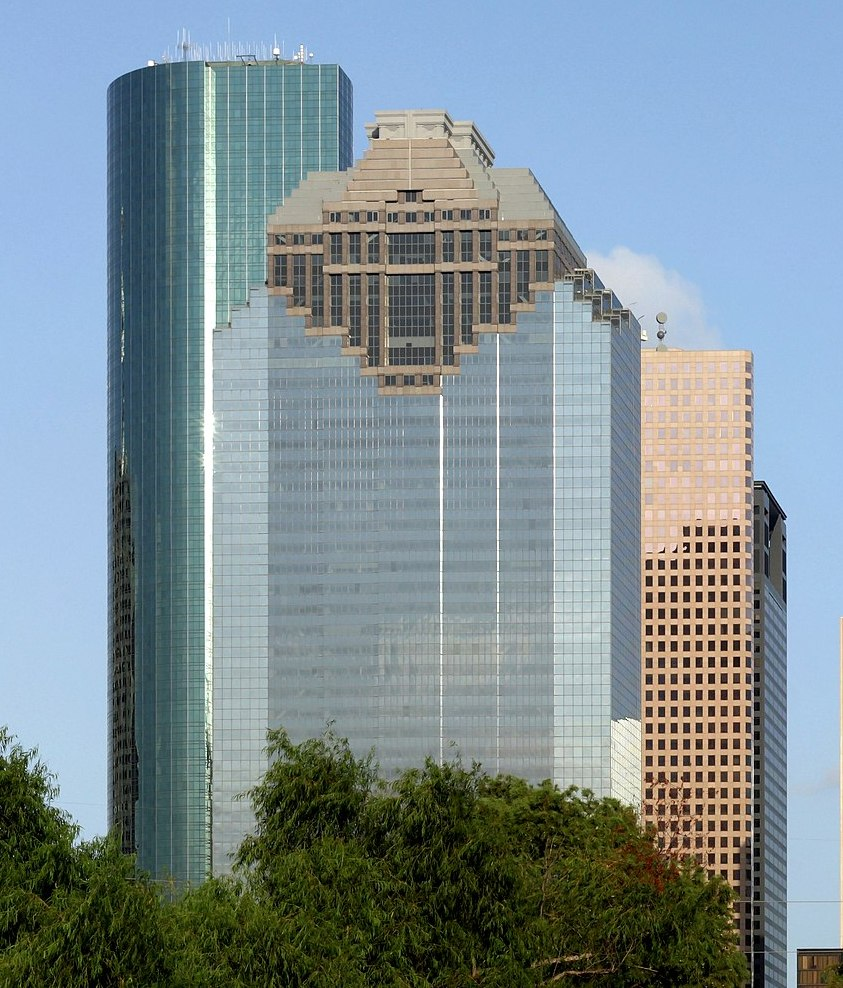
The granite feature on the top of Heritage Plaza was designed to imitate a Mayan temple.

Heritage Plaza is well known because of its central location in the central business district skyline, and for the stepped granite feature located on the top of the building that resembles a Mayan pyramid. This feature was inspired by the architect's visit to the Mexican Yucatán Peninsula. The crown of the building is also said to resemble an image of a bald eagle spreading its wings.

The interior lobby of Heritage Plaza was also designed with Mexican influences. The lower levels of the building, which contain a large food court, contain a distinctive multi-level marble waterfall that falls from the lobby.

Heritage Plaza is one of the few skyscrapers in downtown Houston that is not directly connected to the extensive Houston tunnel network. It is, however, connected to the DoubleTree Hotel Houston-Allen Center through a skyway.

== See also ==
- List of tallest buildings in Houston
- List of tallest buildings in Texas
- List of tallest buildings in the United States
