= Michael Green Architecture =

Canadian architecture firm

- Type: Architectural practice
- Industry: Architecture, interior design, landscape design, construction
- Founded: 2012
- Headquarters: Vancouver, British Columbia, Canada
- Key people: Michael Green (architect) (Founder and Partner), Natalie Telewiak (Partner)
- Number of employees: 40+
- Website: www.mg-architecture.ca

Michael Green Architecture Inc., commonly referred to as MGA, is a Vancouver, British Columbia, Canada-based multi-disciplinary architecture and interior design firm founded by Michael Green (architect) in 2012.

== History ==
Michael Green Architecture was founded by Michael Green after he left his former partnership, McFarlane Green Biggar Architecture and Design (MGB). The firm designs buildings of all sizes and typologies using timber, including the Wood Innovation Design Centre in Prince George, British Columbia - which, when completed in 2015, was the tallest wooden building in the world at eight storeys (96 ft 29 m) tall. In 2017, they designed T3 Minneapolis, a 7-storey, 220,000 square feet (20,439 m^{2}) building, which was the largest modern timber building in North America at the time.

In May 2018, MGA was acquired by Katerra, a Silicon Valley construction start-up. Through the acquisition, Katerra purchased 100% of the economic interests in MGA. The voting shares remained majority-owned and controlled by MGA's Principals Natalie Telewiak and Michael Green. Michael Green remains the president and CEO of the firm.

In 2021 and 2023 Architizer A+ named MGA North American Firm of the Year and [Royal Architectural Institute of Canada] (RAIC) recognized MGA with the Architectural Firm Award.

In June 2021, Katerra announced that it was shutting down operations, resulting in MGA reverting to an independent firm with principals Natalie Telewiak and Michael Green assuming full control of all operations.

== Projects ==
=== Completed projects ===
- Google Borregas, Sunnyvale, California (completed 2023) Google's first mass timber development
- Catalyst Building, Spokane, Washington (completed 2020)
- Oregon State University College of Forestry, Corvallis, Oregon (completed 2020)
- The Dock Building, Vancouver, British Columbia, Canada (completed 2018)
- North Vancouver Passive House Plus House, North Vancouver, British Columbia (completed 2017)
- T3 Minneapolis, Minneapolis, Minnesota (completed 2016)
- Ronald McDonald House BC, Vancouver (completed 2014)
- Wood Innovation and Design Centre, Prince George, BC (completed 2014)
- Sixth + Willow, Vancouver (completed 2014)
- North Vancouver City Hall, North Vancouver (completed 2012)

=== Under construction ===
- Parkway Building, Victoria, BC
- Scott Building, Victoria, BC
- Les Groues, Nanterre (92), France

== Awards ==
- 2021 RAIC Architectural Firm Award
- 2021 Architizer A+ Award - Best Firm of the Year (North America)
- 2020 AIA Innovation Award - Catalyst Building
- 2020 RAIC Governor General's Award - The Dock Building
- 2019 Architizer A+ Award - Commercial Mixed-Use - The Dock Building
- 2019 Architizer A+ Award - Architecture + Facades - The Dock Building
- 2018 AIBC Special Jury Award - The Dock Building
- 2018 Rethinking the Future Architecture, Construction, & Design Awards - Commercial (Built), The Dock Building
- 2018 Azure Best of Canadian Architecture Award - Best Timber Building (The Dock Building)
- 2017 AZ Award - Environmental Leadership - T3 Minneapolis
- 2017 NAIOP Minnesota Award of Excellence - T3 Minneapolis
- 2017 AIA Chicago – Distinguished Building Award - T3 Minneapolis
- 2017 Azure AZ Awards – Environmental Leadership + People's Choice - T3 Minneapolis
- 2017 US WoodWorks Wood Design – Special Achievement Award - T3 Minneapolis
- 2016 RAIC Governor General's Medal in Architecture - Wood Innovation and Design Centre
- 2016 RAIC Governor General's Medal in Architecture - Wood Innovation and Design Centre
- 2016 RAIC Governor General's Medal in Architecture - Ronald McDonald House BC & Yukon
- 2016 Wood Design + Buildings - Citation Award, T3
- 2016 Architectural Woodwork Manufacturers Association of Canada – Large Commercial Projects – Quality | Silver, Interfor
- 2015 RAIC Award of Excellence for Innovation in Architecture - Wood Innovation and Design Centre
- 2015 Lieutenant-Governor of BC Award in Architecture (Merit) - Wood Innovation and Design Centre
- 2015 AIBC Innovation Award - Wood Innovation and Design Centre
- 2015 WoodWorks Wood Design Award BC – Wood Innovation Award - Wood Innovation and Design Centre
- 2015 Canadian Design Build Institute – First Prize Award of Excellence - Wood Innovation and Design Centre
- 2015 Lieutenant-Governor of BC Award in Architecture (Merit) - Ronald McDonald House BC & Yukon
- 2015 WoodWorks Wood Design Award BC – Institution Wood Design (Large) - Ronald McDonald House BC & Yukon
- 2015 Masonry Institute of BC – Award of Excellence (Low Rise) - Ronald McDonald House BC & Yukon
- 2015 WoodWorks Wood Design Award BC – Architect of the Year -Architect (Michael Green)
- 2014 RAIC Governor General's Medal in Architecture - North Vancouver City Hall
- 2014 The Canadian Wood Council – Wood Design & Building Award Citation - Wood Innovation and Design Centre
- 2014 Azure Top 10 Big Projects: Best Construction - Wood Innovation and Design Centre

== Publications ==
- The Case for Tall Wood Buildings, 2012
- Technical guide for the design and construction of tall wood buildings in Canada, FP Innovation, 2014
- Alpenglow, 2015
- The Case for Tall Wood Buildings (2nd Edition), 2017
- Tall Wood Buildings: Design, Construction and Performance., Birkhäuser 2017
- Tall Wood Buildings: Design, Construction and Performance (2nd Expanded Edition), Birkhäuser 2020
- Technical guide for the design and construction of tall wood buildings in Canada (2021 Edition), FP Innovation - IN PROGRESS
