= Buzzard oil field =

Oil field in the United Kingdom

Buzzard Oil Field
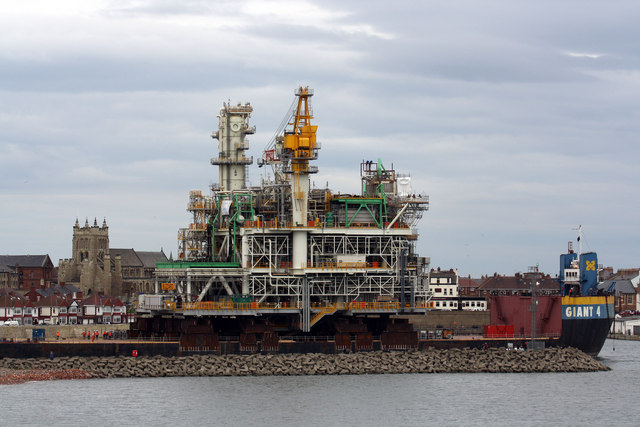
- An oil platform departing Hartlepool for the Buzzard field in 2010
- Country: United Kingdom
- Region: North Sea
- Offshore/onshore: offshore
- Operator: CNOOC - 43%,
- Partners: Suncor Energy - 30%, BG Group - 22%, Edinburgh Oil & Gas - 5%

Field history
- Discovery: 2001
- Start of production: 2007
- Peak year: 2009

Production
- Current production of oil: 85,500 barrels per day (~4.26×10^{6} t/a)
- Year of current production of oil: 2020
- Estimated oil in place: 1,500 million barrels (~2.0×10^{8} t)

The Buzzard Oil Field is an oil field located in the North Sea Blocks 19/10, 19/5a, 20/6 and 20/1s. It was discovered in 2001 by PanCanadian, and developed initially by PanCanadian's successor EnCana and then by Nexen. The oil field was initially operated and owned by Nexen which is now a subsidiary of China's CNOOC.

== The field ==
The total proven reserves of the Buzzard oil field are 240 million cubic metres (1.5 billion barrels), and production will be centered on 28,670 cubic metres (180,300 bbl) per day.

The Buzzard reservoir has a low gas/oil ratio and requires pressure maintenance through water injection. Buzzard’s oil consists of medium sour crude: 32.6° API, 1.4% sulphur.

== Infrastructure ==
The Buzzard field development comprises four bridge-linked steel platforms: the wellhead facilities (W) for up to 27 production wells, production facilities (P), a platform supporting accommodation and utilities (UQ) and an oil stripper platform (PS).

== Processing ==
The oil processing facilities comprise a 3-phase (oil/vapour/water) Production Separator. Oil from the separator flows to the 3-phase Second Stage Separator. Oil from the latter is 'spiked' with Natural Gas Liquids (NGL) from the gas dewpointing plant, then injected with a hydrogen sulphide (H_{2}S) scavenger chemical prior to metering and export.

Produced water from the Second Stage Separator is recycled to the Production Separator, and from there to the produced water treatment facilities using hydrocyclones before overboard disposal.

Vapour from the two Separators is compressed in an Offgas Compressor and a LP/HP compressor. Compressed gas passes through a Mercury Removal Bed and an Acid Gas Removal system, which uses a counter-current flow of amine solvent, and then through a Mercaptans Removal Bed. The gas is dehydrated in a gas dehydration system which uses a counter-current flow of glycol. After dehydration the gas is cooled and passes through a Joule-Thomson valve to reduce its pressure and hence its temperature to remove liquids and achieve a gas hydrocarbon dewpoint. Natural Gas Liquids are separated and co-mingled with the export oil stream. Gas is compressed in the HP Compressors, some is used as gas lift on the production wells, some as fuel gas, and the remainder is exported.

== Export ==
Oil is exported from Buzzard via an 18 inch pipeline from the Buzzard processing platform to the nearest point in the Forties to Cruden Bay System, approximately 28 km away. Oil flows to Cruden Bay and then onto the Kinneil Terminal. First oil was produced in December 2006.

Gas is exported via a 250 millimetres (10 in) pipeline from Buzzard to the Captain ‘T’ point on the UK Frigg pipeline 29 km away. From there the gas is transported to the St Fergus Gas Terminal. Fuel gas can also be imported onto Buzzard from the Frigg pipeline.

== Production history ==
Buzzard was the largest discovery in UK waters for 20 years when it was found in 2001 and went on to become the largest-producing field in the region after starting up in 2007.

Once at a peak of more than 35,000 cubic metres (220,000 barrels) of oil equivalent per day in 2009, production has decreased to 13,590 cubic metres (85,500 barrels) of oil equivalent per day as of May 2020, according to Oil and Gas Authority (OGA) figures.

Buzzard was temporarily shutdown twice in late 2019 for repairs to topside pipework.

== Expansion ==
Buzzard Phase 2 is a bid to go after additional reserves to the north of the main field with a subsea development tied-back to it, with expected peak production of 5,900 cubic metres (37,000 barrels) of oil equivalent per day.

The first stage includes installation of a subsea manifold, a new processing module for the platform and drilling of four production wells. First oil from Buzzard Phase 2 was expected in late 2020 but as of August 2020, CNOOC postponed the project to 2021. Chrysaor stated that the drilling results for Buzzard Phase 2 was "towards the lower end of expectations," with the project now expected to come on stream in December 2021.
