= Joseph Colaco =

American structural engineer

Joseph P. Colaco
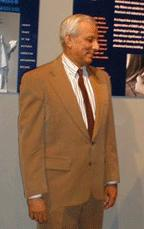
- Joseph P. Colaco
- Education: University of Mumbai, University of Illinois at Urbana–Champaign
- Engineering career
- Discipline: Civil engineering, structural engineering
- Significant design: JPMorgan Chase Tower (Houston), Williams Tower, Two Prudential Plaza, Bank of America Plaza (Atlanta), Wells Fargo Center (Denver)

Dr. Joseph Philip Colaco is an Indian structural engineer and author. Dr. Colaco, known as Joe, is noted for his contributions to the supertall skyscrapers in the United States and in Middle East. He received his PhD. in civil structural engineering from the University of Illinois in 1965.

In 1965, employed by Skidmore, Owings and Merrill, he began working in Chicago, Illinois. In 1969 he joined Ellisor Engineers Inc., Houston, Texas. Dr. Colaco established his own company, CBM Engineers Inc. in 1975 and has been serving as the President of the company.

Dr. Colaco's design innovations improved the construction of high-rise buildings, enabling them to withstand enormous forces generated on these super structures. These new designs opened an economic door for contractors, engineers, architects, and investors, providing vast amounts of real estate space on minimal plots of land.

Dr. Colaco has three sons and seven grandchildren.

He is noted for his contributions to the designs for some of the multi-billion dollar projects in the United States, Middle East and India including Chicago's 100-story John Hancock Center, 75-story JPMorgan Chase Tower in Houston, 160-story Burj Khalifa Tower in Dubai (present tallest tower in the world) and The Imperial Twin Towers, Tardeo, Mumbai, India. He has also been consulted on the design of a bonfire at Texas A & M University.

== Membership ==
National Academy of Engineering, American Concrete Institute, American Society of Civil Engineers, American Institute of Steel Construction.

== Awards ==
He received the Distinguished Alumni Award in 2002 from the College of Engineering, University of Illinois at Urbana-Champaign.

== Registrations ==
He is a registered professional engineer in Illinois, Georgia, Texas, Missouri, Colorado, California (Civil) California (Structural Authority), Florida, Michigan, Maryland, Pennsylvania, Virginia, North Carolina, Kentucky, Minnesota, Washington, D.C., United Kingdom and Singapore, Tennessee.
