= Cherry Canyon Formation =

Geologic formation in New Mexico and Texas, US

- Stratigraphic range: Roadian-Wordian; ~272–266 Ma
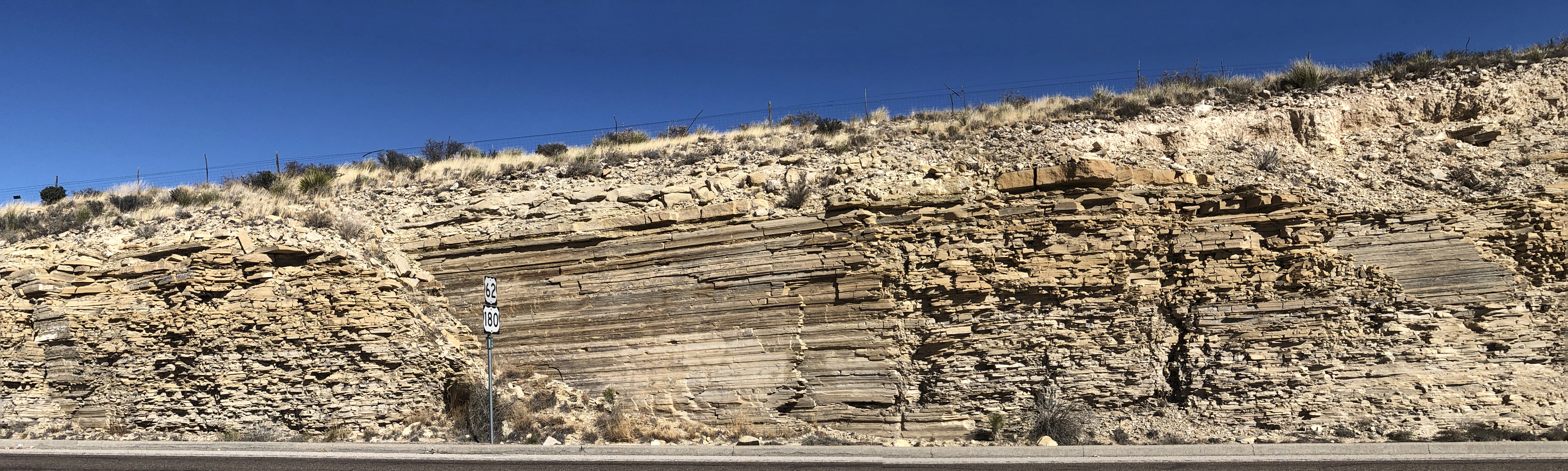
- Cherry Canyon Formation exposed in roadcut near its type location
- Type: Geological formation
- Unit of: Delaware Mountain Group
- Sub-units: Getaway, South Wells, and Manzanita Members
- Underlies: Bell Canyon Formation
- Overlies: Brushy Canyon Formation
- Thickness: 400 m (1,300 ft)

Lithology
- Primary: Sandstone, siltstone
- Other: Limestone

Location
- Coordinates: 31.899°N 104.780°W
- Approximate paleocoordinates: 3.7°N 34.1°W
- Region: New Mexico, Texas
- Country: United States
- Extent: Guadalupe and Delaware Mountains

Type section
- Named for: Cherry Canyon
- Named by: DeFord and Lloyd
- Year defined: 1940
- Cherry Canyon Formation (the United States) Cherry Canyon Formation (Texas)

The Cherry Canyon Formation is a geologic formation found in the Delaware Basin of southeastern New Mexico and western Texas. It contains fossils characteristic of the Guadalupian Age of the Permian Period.

== Description ==
The formation consists mostly of cyclic marine sandstone and siltstone, but with interfingering tongues of gray limestone (the Getaway, South Wells, and Manzanita Members). These extend from the Goat Seep reef, an earlier and much smaller precursor to the Capitan reef, into what was then deep, anoxic water of the Permian Basin. A lower tongue of the formation extends across the basin margin to grade into the nearby San Andres Formation. Maximum thickness of the Cherry Canyon Formation is 400 meters (1,300 ft). The formation rests on the Brushy Canyon Formation, but the lower tongue fills a few deep paleochannels that cut down through the Brushy Canyon and the underlying Cutoff Formation into the Victorio Peak Formation. A hiatus in deposition, marking a substantial drop in sea level, separates the Cherry Canyon Formation from the overlying Bell Canyon Formation.

The Getaway Member contains carbonate debris flow beds. All three carbonate members grade into sandstone channel deposits deeper in the basin.

== Fossils ==
The formation contain abundant fish fossils, such as sharks' teeth, preserved within small phosphatic nodules. Ostracods have been identified in the Getaway Member, including Amphissites, Aurikirkbya, Ceratobairdia, Polytylites, and Roundyella.

== Economic resources ==
The Cherry Canyon Formation has been exploited for its hydrocarbon resources. Some of the hydrocarbons present in the formation may have leaked into nearby gypsum beds of the Castile Formation, producing sulfuric acid that contributed to the formation of Carlsbad Cavern.

== History of investigation ==
The unit was first designated as a formation by DeFord and Lloyd in 1940, who raised the Delaware Mountain Formation to group rank and designed its previously informal members as formations.

== Footnotes ==
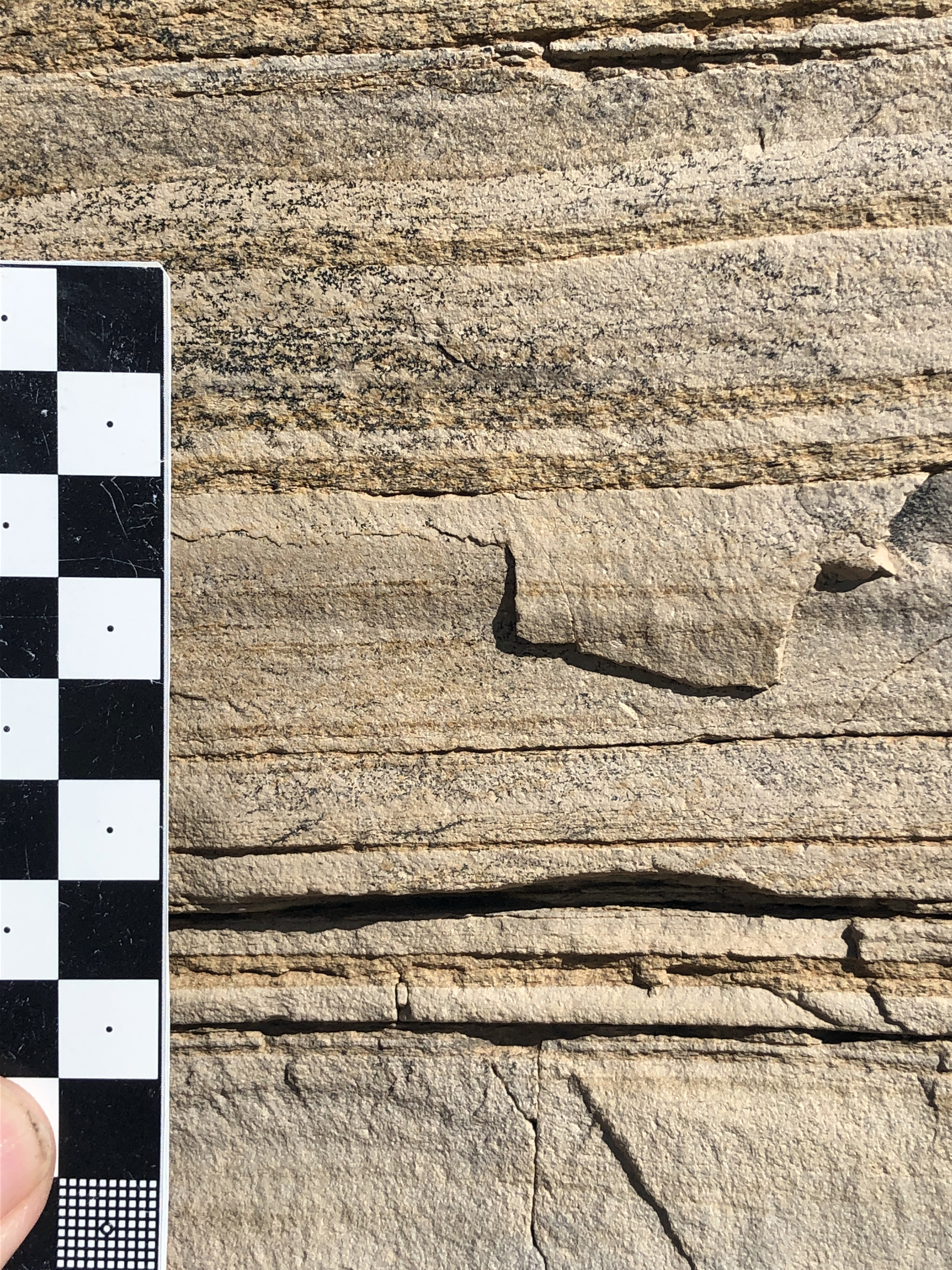
Laminae in the Cherry Canyon Formation

=== Bibliography ===
- DeFord, Ronald K.; Lloyd, E. Russell (1940). "West Texas-New Mexico Symposium: Part I Editorial Introduction". AAPG Bulletin. 24. doi:10.1306/3D933188-16B1-11D7-8645000102C1865D.
- Hunt, ReBecca K., Vincent L. Santucci and Jason Kenworthy. 2006. "A preliminary inventory of fossil fish from National Park Service units." in S.G. Lucas, J.A. Spielmann, P.M. Hester, J.P. Kenworthy, and V.L. Santucci (ed.s), Fossils from Federal Lands. New Mexico Museum of Natural History and Science Bulletin 34, pp. 63–69
- King, Philip B. (1948). "Geology of the Southern Guadalupe Mountains, Texas". U.S. Geological Survey Professional Paper. 215: 36. doi:10.3133/pp215.
- Kues, B.S.; Giles, K.A. (2004). "The late Paleozoic Ancestral Rocky Mountain system in New Mexico". In Mack, G.H.; Giles, K.A. (eds.). The geology of New Mexico. A geologic history: New Mexico Geological Society Special Volume 11. pp. 95–136. ISBN 9781585460106.
