= Cutoff Formation =

Geologic formation in Texas and New Mexico, US

- Stratigraphic range: Cisuralian to Guadalupian
- Type: Formation
- Underlies: Cherry Canyon Formation; Brushy Canyon Formation
- Overlies: Bone Spring Formation; Victorio Peak Formation
- Thickness: 233 feet (71 m)

Lithology
- Primary: Shale

Location
- Coordinates: 32.002°N 104.921°W
- Region: Texas; New Mexico
- Country: United States

Type section
- Named for: Cutoff Mountain
- Named by: King
- Year defined: 1942
- Cutoff Formation (the United States) Cutoff Formation (New Mexico)

The Cutoff Formation is a geologic formation in Texas and New Mexico, US. It preserves fossils dating back to the Permian period.

== Description ==
The Cutoff Formation consists of 233 feet (71 m) feet of thin limestone beds interbedded with dark shale and sandstone. It grades northwards into the San Andres Formation and is likely correlative with the upper part of the Bone Spring Formation within the Delaware Basin. In age, the formation straddles the Cisuralian - Guadalupian boundary. It lies atop the Victorio Peak or Bone Spring Formation and is overlain by the Brushy Canyon Formation or Cherry Canyon Formation. Both these formations fill paleocanyons cut deeply in the Cutoff Formation, in some cases cutting clear through to the underlying Bone Springs or Victorio Peak beds.

The formation is interpreted as a deep basin formation deposited on a drowned shelf to basin topography. It contains numerous turbidite sequences.

== Fossils ==
Limestone beds of the formation contain chonetid brachiopods (Chonetes) and gastropods. The formation includes a few massive limestone beds that contain a diverse assemblage of fossils, including fusulinids, corals, and crinoids. Other fossils include the shark Helicoprion, the ammonoids Pseudogastrioceras and Perrinites hilli, the nautiloid Foordiceras, and the fusulinid Parafusulina.

Fishes of the Cutoff Formation
Genus	Species	Notes
Helicoprion	H.davisii	A large eugenodont.
Glikmanius	G.occidentalis G.myachovensis	A large ctenacanth. A mid sized ctenacanth.
Cladodus	C.sp	A mid sized ctenacanth.
Sphenacanthus	S.sp	A mid sized chondricthyian.
Platysomidae indet.	Indeterminate	Indeterminate platysomid.
Palaeoniscoid indet.	Indeterminate	Indeterminate palaeoniscoids.
Bransonella	B. lingulata	A small xenacanth.

== History of investigation ==
The unit was first designated as the Cutoff shaly member of the Bone Spring Limestone by P.B. King in 1942, for exposures on the west face of Cutoff Mountain near the New Mexico - Texas border.

== See also ==
- List of fossiliferous stratigraphic units in Texas
- Paleontology in Texas
