= Goat Seep Formation =

Geologic formation in Texas and New Mexico, US

- Stratigraphic range: Guadalupian
- Type: Formation
- Underlies: Capitan Formation
- Overlies: Cherry Canyon Formation
- Thickness: 1,200 ft (370 m)

Lithology
- Primary: dolomite, limestone
- Other: sandstone

Location
- Coordinates: 31.9040°N 104.8805°W
- Region: Texas; New Mexico
- Country: United States

Type section
- Named for: Goat Seep (spring)
- Named by: King
- Year defined: 1942
- Goat Seep Formation (the United States) Goat Seep Formation (Texas)

The Goat Seep Formation is a geologic formation found in western Texas and southeastern New Mexico. It is a fossilized reef dating to the Guadalupian Age of the Permian period.

The formation underlies Bartlett Peak (31.9177°N 104.8817°W) and nearby areas in Guadalupe Mountains National Park.

== Description ==
The Goat Seep Formation consists of up to 1,200 feet (370 m) of massive to thickly bedded light grey to white dolomite. The lower part of the formation contains some sandstone beds. It grades below into the Cherry Canyon Formation and is overlain by the Capitan Formation, a younger Permian reef. The Capitan Formation and Goat Seep Formation are quite similar, but are separated by an unconformity marked by ledges of dark limestone.

The formation represents a fossil reef, and grades laterally into the shelf limestones of the Grayburg and Queen Formations. It is regarded as a precursor to the Capitan reef. The reef was built mostly by red (Solenopora) and green (Dasycladaceae) algae and cyanobacteria (Girvanella) with calcareous sponges, bryozoa, and hydrocorals also playing a role.

== Fossils ==
Portions of the formation are highly fossiliferous, and these include beds very rich in fusulinids. However, dolomitization (conversion of the original limestone to dolomite) has resulted in very poor preservation of most of these fossils. The fusulinid Parafusulina rothi has been identified in a few locations. Other tentative identifications are of the sponge Guadalupia zitteliana, several genera of brachiopods, some poorly preserved gastropods, and a species of trilobite, Anisopyge perannulata.

== History of investigation ==
The beds were first described by K.H. Crandall and assigned to the Chupadera Formation, a unit recognized in central New Mexico but since abandoned. W.B. Land assigned the same beds to the Dog Canyon Limestone, but P.B. King found this name too similar to that of a unit in the oil fields of Oklahoma, and he renamed the unit as the Goat Seep Limestone. N.D. Newell and coinvestigators renamed the formation as the Goat Seep Dolomite, due to its extensive dolomitization, and reassigned the shelf facies originally assigned to the formation to the Queen Formation.

== See also ==
- List of fossiliferous stratigraphic units in Texas
- Paleontology in Texas
