= Seven Rivers Formation =

Geologic formation in the western United States

- Stratigraphic range: Guadalupian
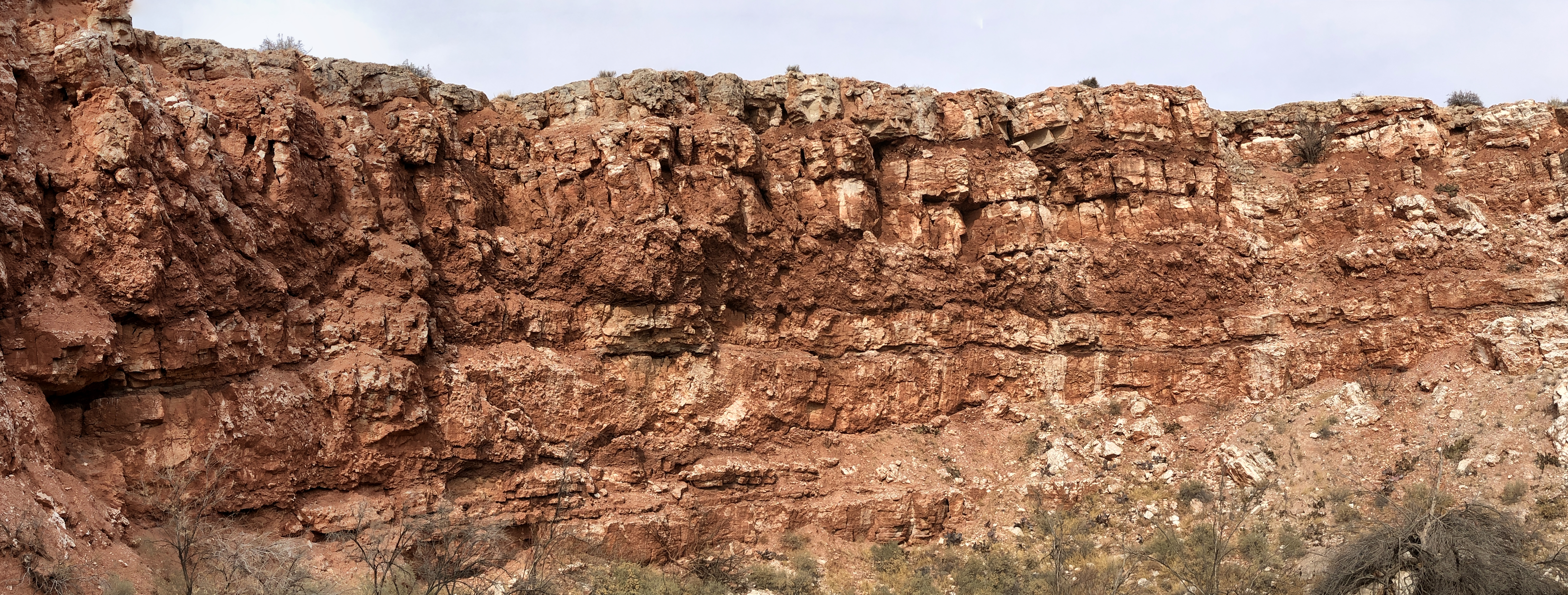
- Cliff of Seven Rivers Formation
- Type: Formation
- Unit of: Artesia Group
- Underlies: Yates Formation
- Overlies: Queen Formation
- Thickness: 400–1,970 feet (120–600 m)

Lithology
- Primary: Anhydrite
- Other: Shale, siltstone, dolomite (rock), sandstone

Location
- Coordinates: 32.497°N 104.256°W
- Region: New Mexico
- Country: U.S.
- Seven Rivers Formation (the United States) Seven Rivers Formation (New Mexico)

The Seven Rivers Formation is a geologic formation in southeastern New Mexico and west Texas. It preserves fossils dating back to the late Guadalupian Epoch of the Permian period.

== Description ==
The formation consists of 400–1,970 feet (120–600 m) of anhydrite, with interbeds of shale, dolomite, siltstone, and sandstone. It rests on the Queen Formation and is overlain by the Yates Formation. The Seven Rivers Formation is part of the Artesia Group, which is interpreted as a sequence of shelf rocks of the Capitan reef.

== History of investigation ==
The unit was first named as the Seven Rivers Member of the (now abandoned) Chupadera Formation by Oscar Edward Meinzer and coinvestigators in 1927. In 1937, W.B. Lang assigned the Seven Rivers Member to the (now abandoned) Chalk Bluff Formation and removed its upper beds to the Three Twins Member. The unit was promoted to formation rank and assigned to the Whitehorse Group by Ronald K. DeFord and E. Russel Lloyd in 1940. Norman D. Newell and coinvestigators assigned the formation to the (now abandoned) Carlsbad Group in 1953, and it was assigned to the Artesia Group by D.B. Tait and coinvestigators in 1962.

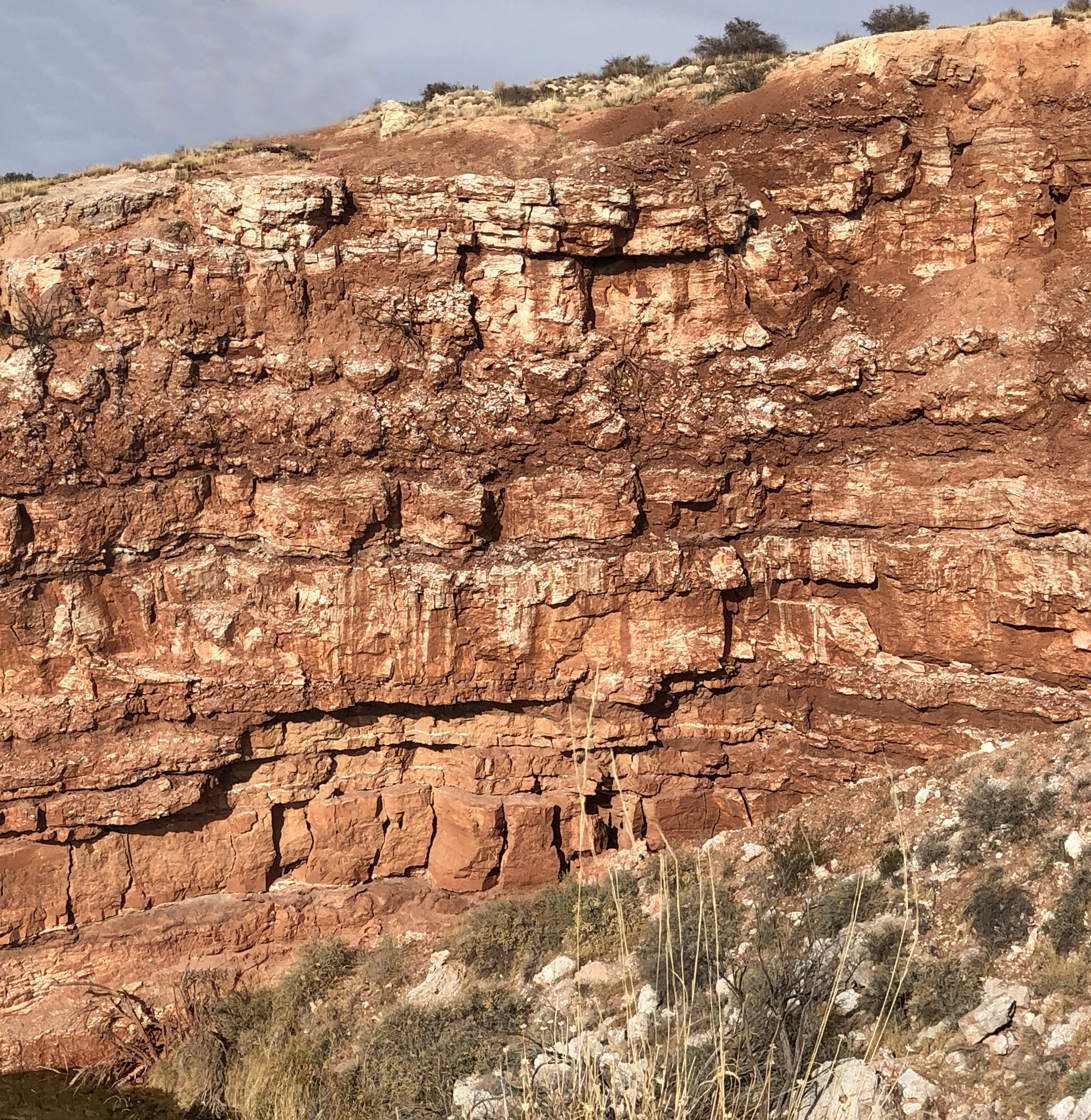
Shales and gypsum of the Seven Rivers Formation, Bottomless Lakes State Park, New Mexico

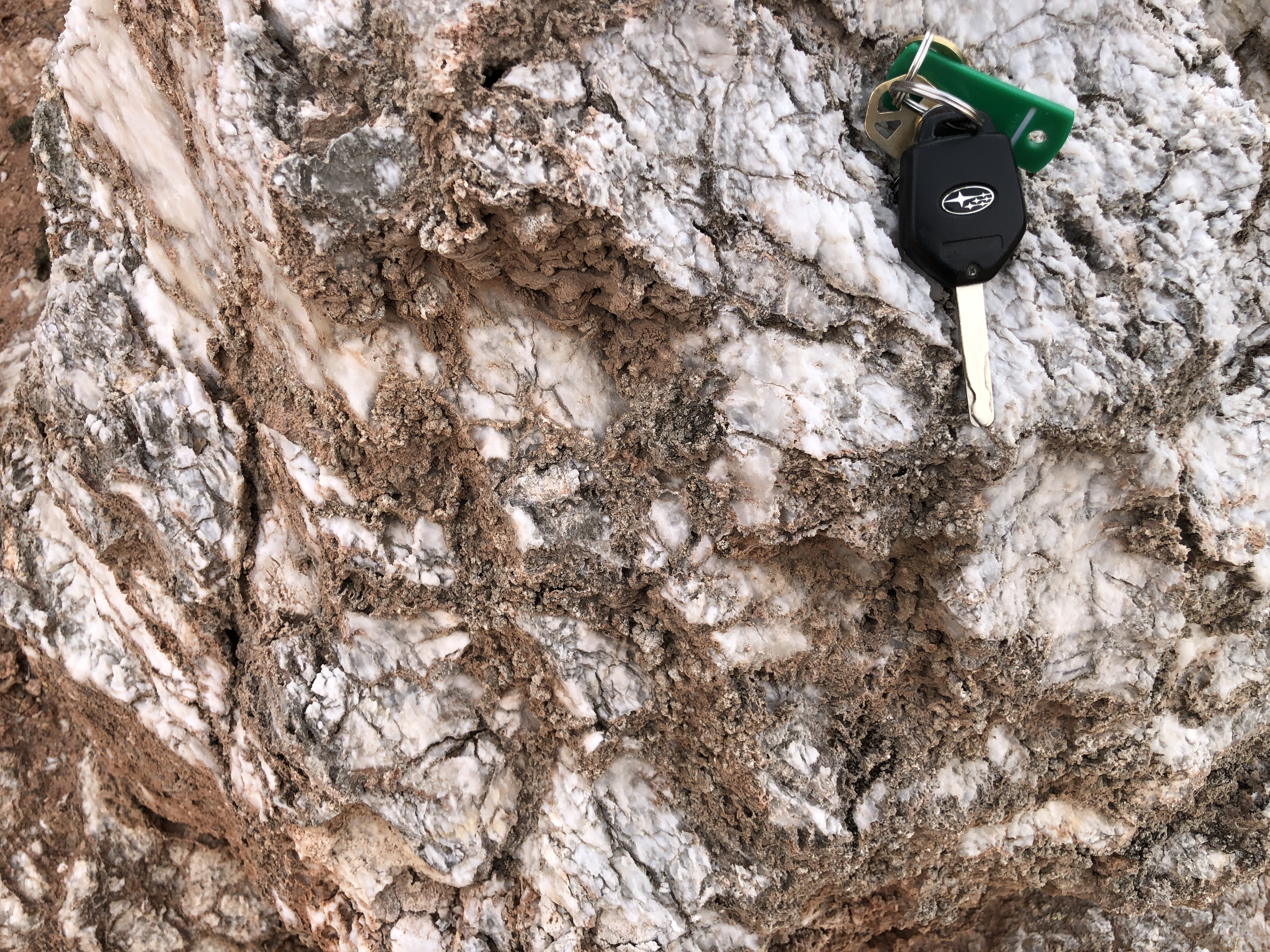
Weathered face of gypsum in the Seven Rivers Formation, Bottomless Lakes State Park, NM. Note the dark, irregular reprecipitated gypsum

== See also ==
- List of fossiliferous stratigraphic units in New Mexico
- Paleontology in New Mexico
