= Tansill Formation =

Geologic formation in the western United States

- Stratigraphic range: Guadalupian
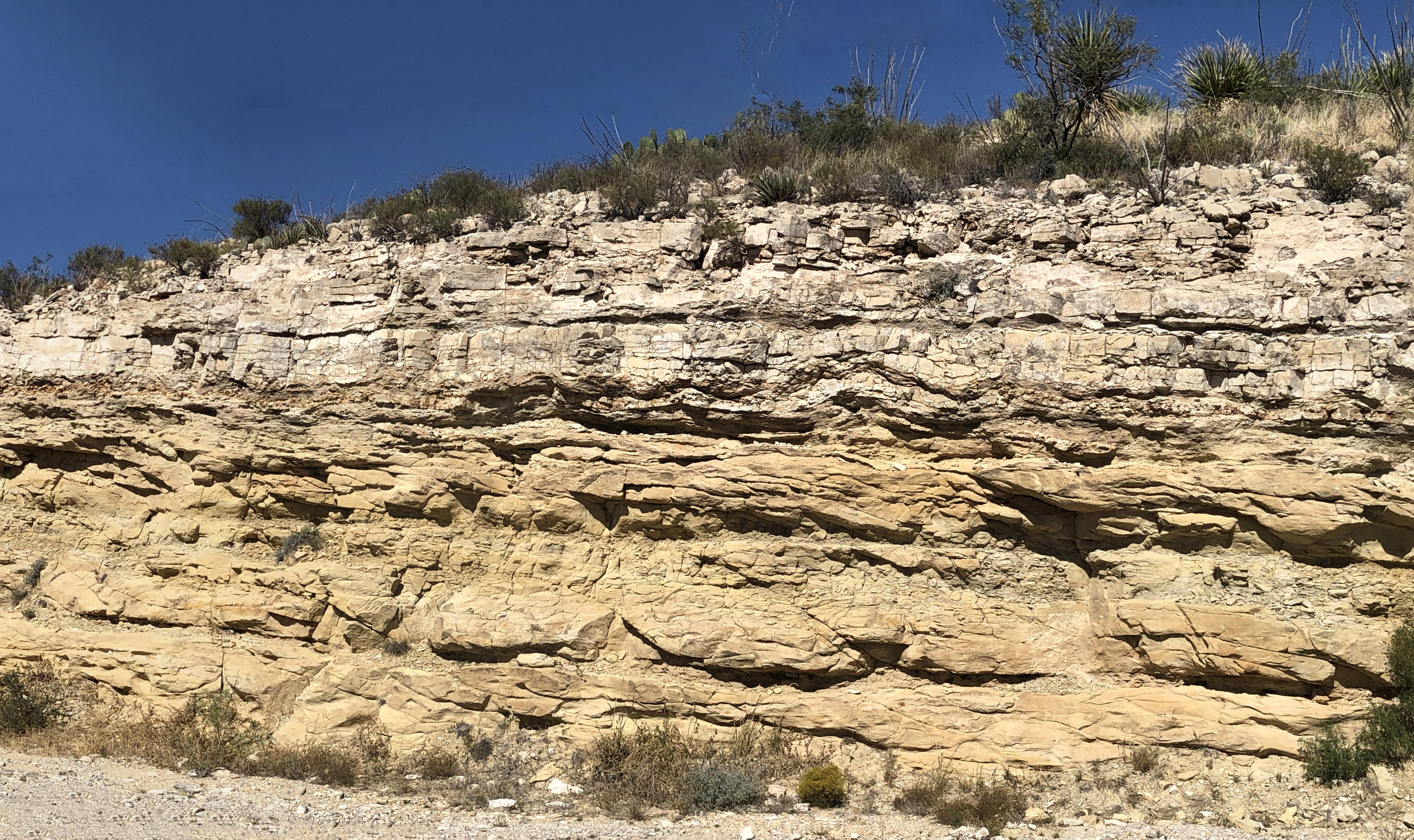
- Yates (yellow sandstone) and Tansill (white limestone)
- Type: Formation
- Unit of: Artesia Group
- Overlies: Yates Formation
- Thickness: 123–320 feet (37–98 m)

Lithology
- Primary: Limestone, siltstone, anhydrite

Location
- Coordinates: 32.448°N 104.265°W
- Region: New Mexico
- Country: United States

Type section
- Named for: Tansill power dam
- Named by: DeFord et al.
- Year defined: 1938
- Tansill Formation (the United States) Tansill Formation (New Mexico)

The Tansill Formation is a geologic formation in southeastern New Mexico and west Texas, United States. It preserves fossils dating back to the late Guadalupian Age of the Permian period.

== Description ==
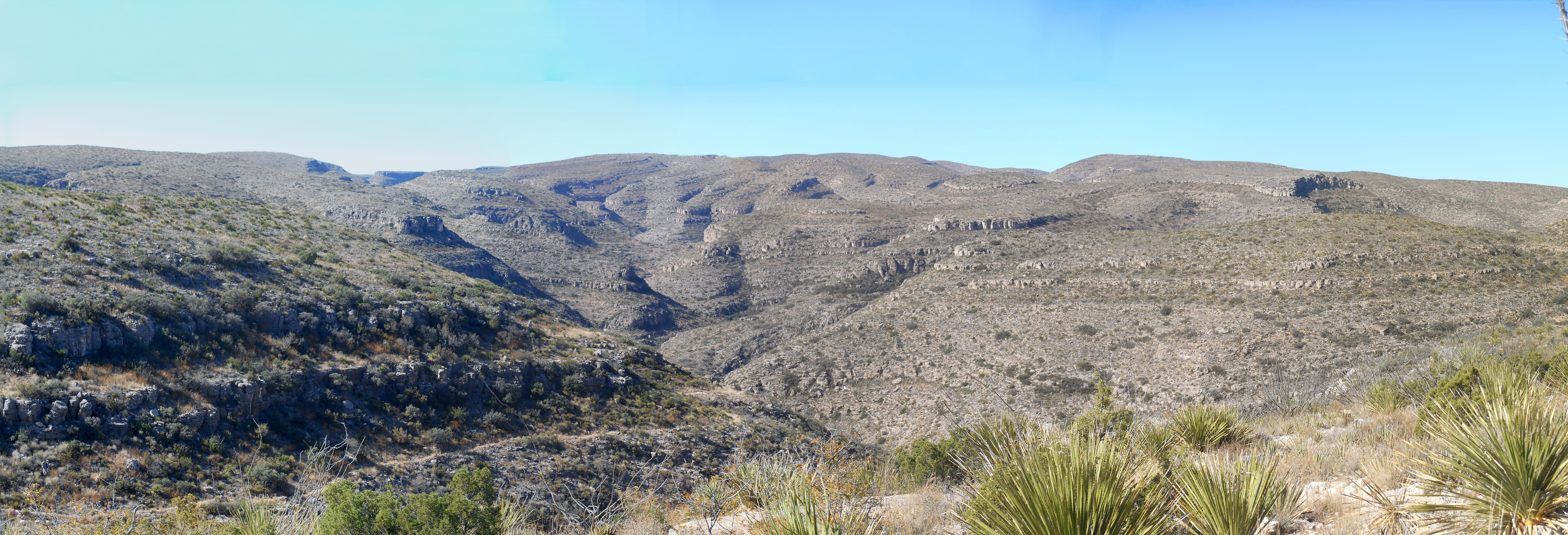
Tansill Formation exposed at Rattlesnake Canyon as viewed from the trailhead, Carlsbad National Park

The formation consists of limestone, siltstone, and anhydrite that is extensive in the subsurface in southeastern New Mexico and west Texas. The formation is mostly limestone in the south and west, around the rim of the Delaware Basin, and grades into anhydrite in the north and east. It forms the top of the Capitan reef but dips steeply into the subsurface. It has a total thickness of 123–320 feet (37–98 m). It overlies the Yates Formation. The formation is part of the Artesia Group, which is interpreted as a shelf rock sequence.

== History of investigation ==
The formation was first named by DeFord et al. in 1938 and formally defined in 1941 and assigned to the (now abandoned) Whitehorse Group. Tait et al. assigned it to the newly defined Artesia Group in 1962.

== See also ==
- List of fossiliferous stratigraphic units in New Mexico
- Paleontology in New Mexico
