= Delaware Basin =

Geologic depositional and structural basin in West Texas and southern New Mexico

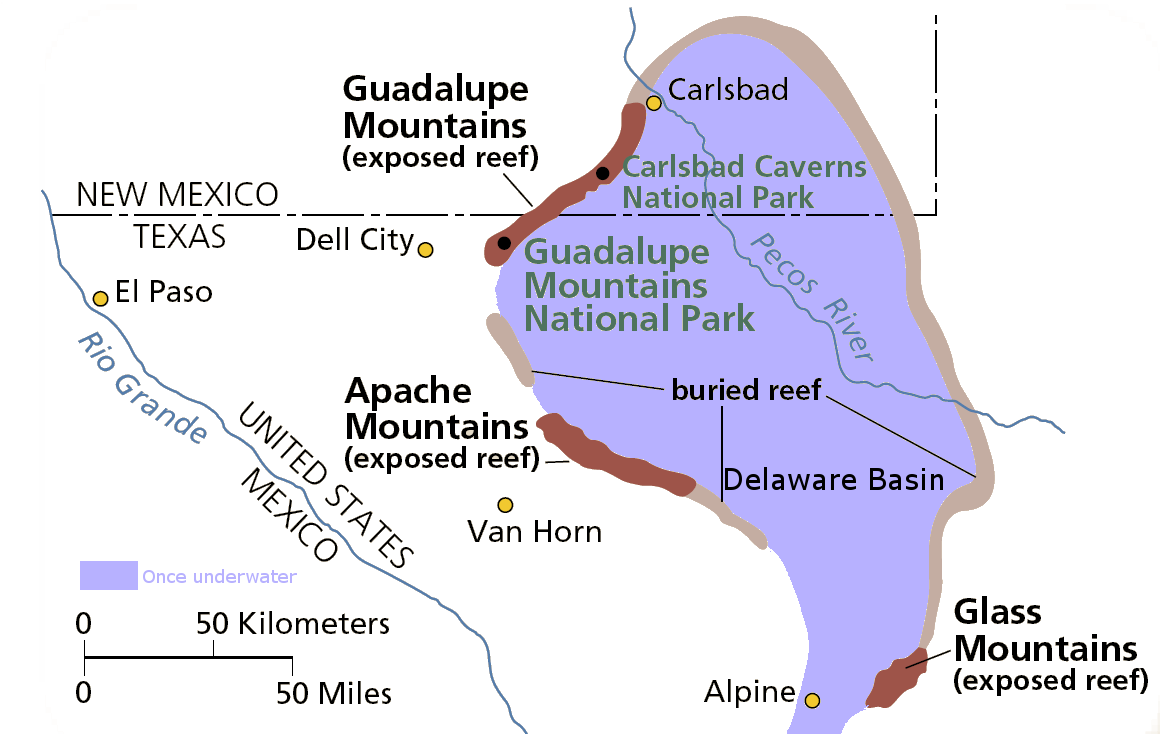
Exposed and buried parts of Capitan Reef. Blue area shows area once flooded by the Delaware Sea.

The Delaware Basin is a geologic depositional and structural basin in West Texas and southern New Mexico, famous for holding large oil fields and for a fossilized reef exposed at the surface. Guadalupe Mountains National Park and Carlsbad Caverns National Park protect part of the basin. It is part of the larger Permian Basin, itself contained within the Mid-Continent oil province.

== Geology ==
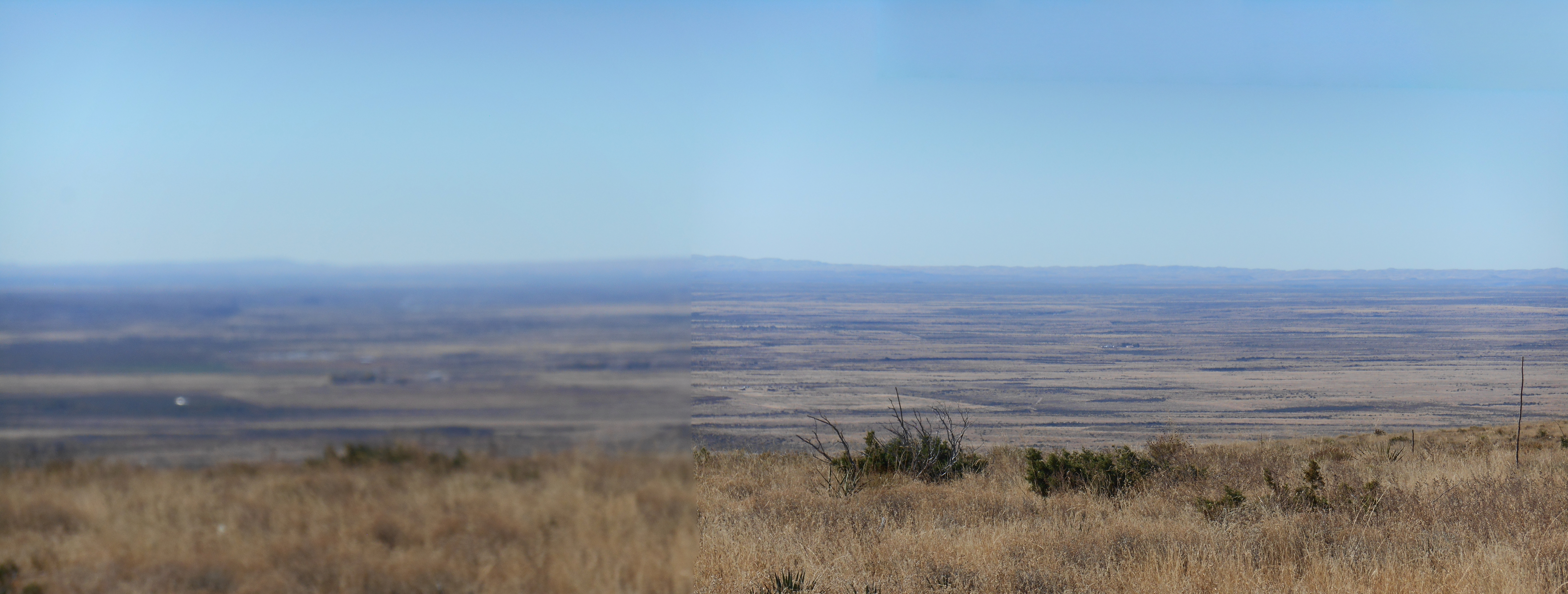
View looking south showing the flatness of the Delaware Basin. Image from the Walnut Canyon drive, Carlsbad Caverns National Park

By earliest Permian time, during the Wolfcampian Epoch, the ovoid shaped subsiding Delaware Basin extended over 10,000 square miles (26,000 km^{2}) in what is now western Texas and southeast New Mexico. This period of deposition left a thickness of 1,600 to 2,200 feet (490 to 670 m) of limestone interbedded with dark-colored shale.

A narrow outlet that geologists call the Hovey Channel periodically supplied new seawater from the Panthalassa Ocean to the west. The somewhat smaller and shallower Midland Basin was just east and the much smaller Marfa Basin was to the southwest. All three basins were south of the equator, north of the Ouachita Mountains of mid-Texas, and part of the northern continent Laurasia. Structurally the Delaware, Midland and Marfa were foreland basins created when the Ouachita Mountains were uplifted as the southern continent Gondwana collided with Laurasia, forming the supercontinent Pangea in the Late Carboniferous (Pennsylvanian). The Ouachita Mountains formed a rainshadow over the basins, and a warm shallow sea flooded the surrounding area. On the other side of the equator, the Ancestral Rocky Mountains formed a large mountainous island.

The Delaware Basin temporarily stopped subsiding in the Leonardian Epoch at the start of the mid-Permian. Small banks along its margin developed along with small discontinuous patch reefs in the shallow water just offshore. The first formation that resulted was the Yeso and consists of alternating beds of dolomitic limestone, gypsum, and sandstone. The sediments responsible for creating the Yeso were deposited in nearshore areas that graded into the carbonate banks of the Victorio Peak Formation in the deeper waters. Thin-bedded limestones of the Bone Spring Formation accumulated as limy ooze in the stagnant deepest part of the basin.

Subsidence of the Delaware Basin restarted later in the mid Permian and by the Guadalupian Epoch of the upper Permian the patch reefs had grown larger. Sediments deposited close to the shore are now the cherty dolomites of the San Andres Formation while deposition a little further out forms the quartz sandstone and scattered patch reefs of the Brushy Canyon Formation.

Rapid subsidence of the basin started in the middle Guadalupian. Patch reefs responded by rapid (mostly vertical) growth, resulting in the Goat Seep Reef. Three facies developed:

- Sediments deposited in a lagoon, forming the sandstones and dolomites of the Queen and Grayburg Formations.
- Sponge and algae skeletons accumulated near the Goat Seep Reef to become the Getaway Bank.
- Quartz sand laid down further in the basin became the Cherry Canyon Formation.

Subsidence of the basin stopped for good by the later part of the Guadalupian. Capitan Reef was the largest in the basin, and it rapidly grew 350 miles (560 km) around it. The facies were:

- Fine-grained sand and carbonates deposited near the shore became the dolomites and sandstone of the Artesia Group.
- Offshore accumulations of sand and limey ooze in the basin were lithified into sandstone and limestone belonging to the Bell Canyon Formation.
- The Capitan Formation consists of Capitan Reef and is made of reef limestone.

Capitan Reef was built primarily from calcareous sponges, encrusting algae such as stromatolites, and directly from seawater as a limey mud. In stark contrast, Cenozoic (current era), Mesozoic (age of the dinosaurs), and even middle Paleozoic (well before the Permian) reefs are mainly composed of corals.

Sea level dropped as the late Permian glaciation intensified and locked increasing amounts of water in distant ice caps. Sedimentation continued to fill the Delaware Basin into the Ochoan Epoch of the upper Permian, periodically cutting the basin off from its source of seawater. Part of the resulting brine became the deep-water evaporites of the Castile Formation. The Castile consists of 1/16 inch (1.6 mm) thick laminae of alternating gray anhydrite and gypsum, brown calcite, and halite. As the salt concentration increased, halite and potassium-rich salt precipitated from the briny body of water on its margin and on nearshore areas. This salt layer covered an increasingly large area as the water level dropped, forming the Salado Formation.

The Delaware Basin was filled at least to the top of Capitan Reef and mostly covered by dry land before the end of the Ochoan Epoch. Rivers migrated over its surface and deposited the red silt and sand that now constitute the siltstone and sandstone of the Rustler and Dewey Lake Formations. A karst topography developed as groundwater circulated in the buried limestone formations, dissolving away caverns which were later destroyed by infill and erosion.

Uplift associated with the Laramide orogeny in the late Mesozoic and early Cenozoic created a major fault along which the Guadalupe Mountains were thrust into existence. The range forms the tilted upthrown part of the system and the Salt Flat Bolson forms the downfallen block. Capitan Reef limestone was exposed above the surface with the 1000-foot-high (300 m) El Capitan being its most prominent feature. Other large outcrops compose the Apache Mountains and Glass Mountains to the south.

Streams eroded the softer sediment away, lowering the ground level to its current position. Acidic groundwater excavated caves in the limestone of the higher areas and eroded sediment helped fill any remaining Permian-aged caves. Unlike most other caves in limestone, in this case the acid was likely derived from hydrogen sulfide and sulfide-rich brines that were freed by tectonic activity in the mid-Tertiary and mixed with oxygenated groundwater, forming sulfuric acid. Carlsbad Caverns and nearby modern caves started to form at this time in the groundwater-saturated phreatic zone. Due to the semiarid climate, the karst topography that was created lacks the characteristic depressions, sink holes, pits, and solutional fissures on the surface. Mass wasting such as landslides further reduced topographic relief.

Additional uplift of the Guadalupe Mountains in the Pliocene and early Pleistocene epochs enlarged Carlsbad Cavern and nearby caves. Parts of the major caves emerged from the saturated phreatic zone into the vadose with temporary periods of repose during which additional solutional excavation occurred in the phreatic zone. These pauses in emergence are thought to be responsible for creating the different levels in Carlsbad Caverns. Precipitation of carbon dioxide-rich water that infiltrated into the cavern created speleothems, especially in the humid parts of the Pleistocene. Speleothems found in the "Big Room" of Carlsbad were dated using electron spin resonance dating and were found to be 500,000 to 600,000 years old. This indicates that the Big Room level was dry by that time.

The soft and easily eroded gypsum of the Castile Formation was removed, exposing the Guadalupe Escarpment. Additional erosion intersected the upper part of Carlsbad Cavern and other caves, forming their entrances. Drying of cave air has reduced the growth rate of speleothems and encouraged the development of nodular travertine ("cave popcorn").

== See also ==
- List of geographical regions in Texas
- El Capitan (Texas)
- McKittrick Canyon
- Chihuahuan Desert
- West Texas
