= Grayburg Formation =

Geologic formation in west Texas and southern New Mexico, US

- Stratigraphic range: Guadalupian
- Type: Formation
- Unit of: Artesia Group
- Underlies: Queen Formation
- Overlies: San Andres Formation
- Thickness: 294 feet (90 m)

Lithology
- Primary: Dolomite
- Other: Sandstone, anhydrite

Location
- Coordinates: 32.844°N 104.017°W
- Region: New Mexico; Texas
- Country: United States

Type section
- Named for: Grayburg pool
- Named by: R.I. Dickey
- Year defined: 1940
- Grayburg Formation (the United States) Grayburg Formation (New Mexico)

The Grayburg Formation is a geologic formation in west Texas and southern New Mexico. It preserves fossils dating back to the Guadalupian Epoch of the Permian Period.

== Description ==
The formation is found mostly in the subsurface and consists mostly of dolomite with some sandstone and anhydrite. The formation becomes more dominantly carbonate rock near the Guadalupe Reef and the beds become thicker. Away from the reef, the formation becomes increasingly dominated by sandstone.

The formation is interpreted as shallow marine sediments deposited on the San Andres platform, which flanked the Delaware and Midland Basins. The interbedded carbonate rocks and sandstone reflect fluctuations in sea level.

== History of investigation ==
The formation was first defined by Robert I. Dickey in 1940 based on well logs. Dickey assigned the formation to the now-defunct Whitehorse Group. D.B. Tait, W.S. Motts, and M.E. Spitler reassigned the formation to the Artesia Group in 1962. V.C. Kelley subsequently adjusted the definition of the lower contact of the formation, in 1971.
