= San Andres Formation =

San Andres or San Andrés Formation may refer to:

- San Andres Formation, United States, a Permian geologic formations of the southwestern United States
- San Andrés Formation, Argentina, a Late Pliocene to Early Pleistocene geologic formation of Argentina
- San Andrés Formation, Colombia, a Miocene geologic formation of San Andrés Island, Colombia
- San Andrés Sandstone, a Paleogene geologic formation of Colombia
