= Yates Formation =

Geologic formation in the western United States

- Stratigraphic range: Guadalupian
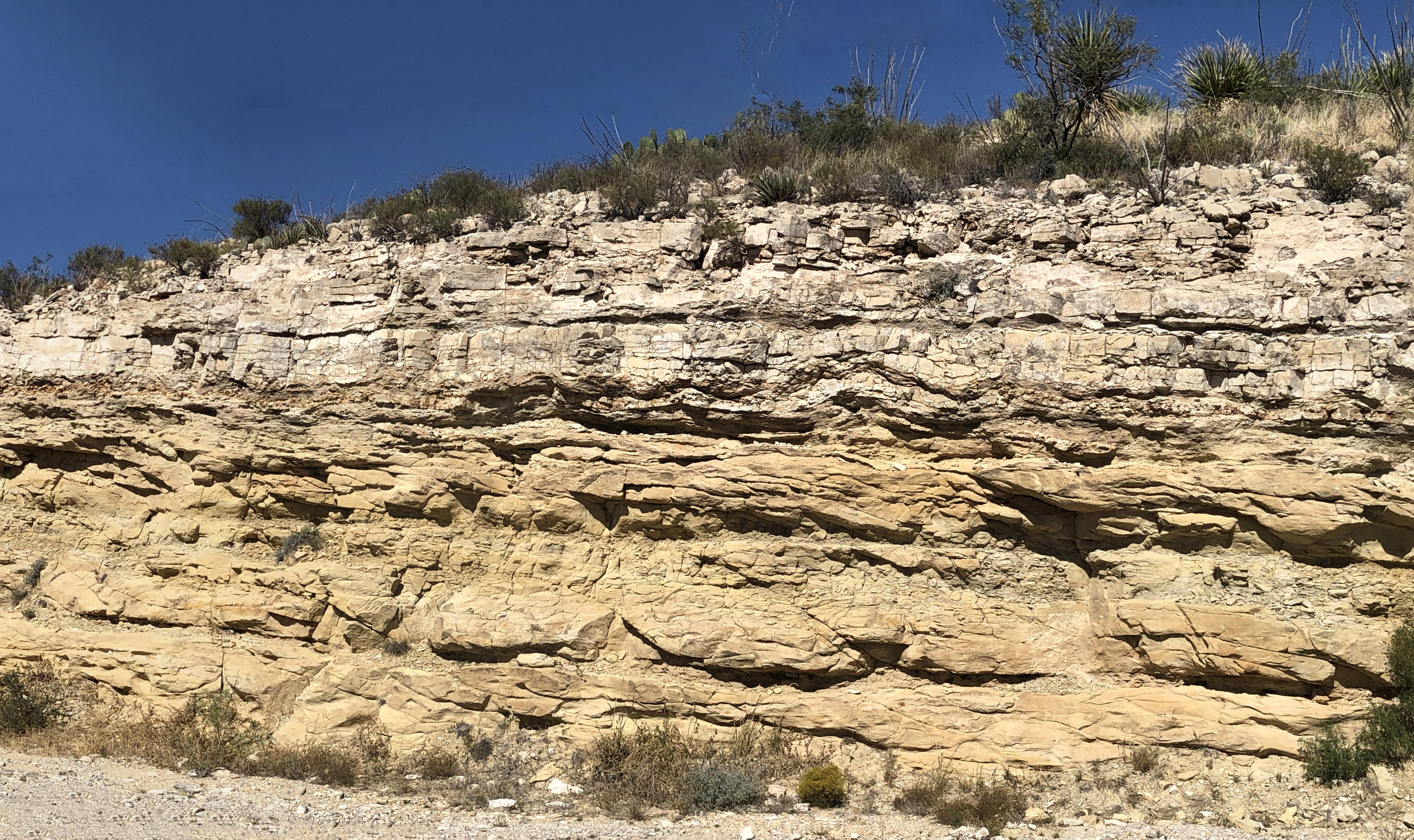
- Yates (yellow sandstone) and Tansill (white limestone); Yates Formation underlying the Tansill Formation
- Type: Formation
- Unit of: Artesia Group
- Underlies: Tansill Formation
- Overlies: Seven Rivers Formation
- Thickness: 266 feet (81 m)

Lithology
- Primary: Sandstone

Location
- Coordinates: 32.40°N 104.29°W
- Region: New Mexico
- Country: United States

Type section
- Named for: Yates oil field
- Named by: Gester and Hawley
- Year defined: 1927
- Yates Formation (the United States) Yates Formation (New Mexico)

The Yates Formation is a geologic formation in southeast New Mexico and west Texas. It preserves fossils dating back to the late Guadalupian Age of the Permian period.

== Description ==
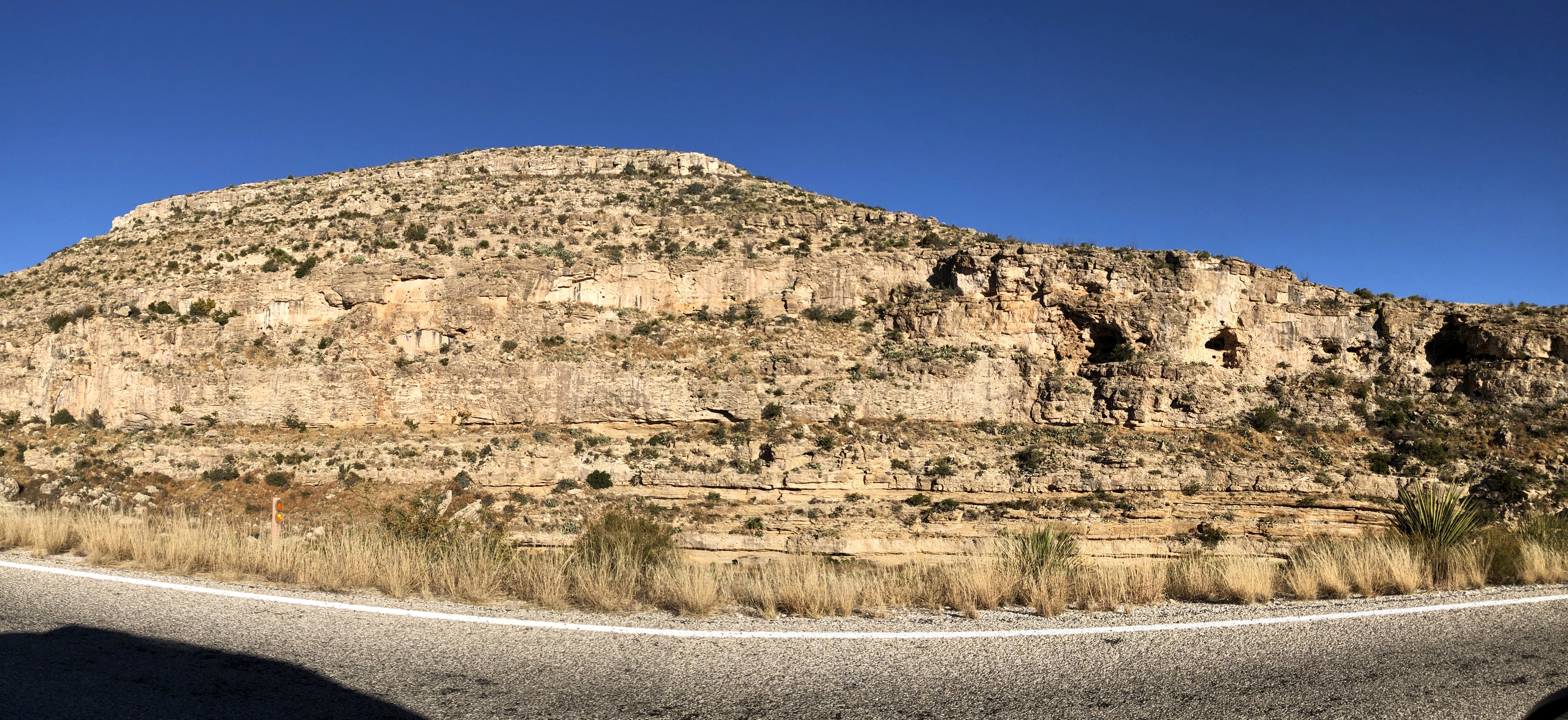
Yates Formation exposed on the side of Walnut Canyon along the main road, Carlsbad Caverns National Park, New Mexico

The formation consists of sandstone, siltstone, and anhydrite. The sandstone is fine to very fine grained and contains scattered large rounded and frosted quartz grains. The formation overlies the Seven Rivers Formation and underlies the Tansill Formation. Its total thickness is 266 feet (81 m).

== History of investigation ==
The unit was first identified in the subsurface at the Yates oil field of west Texas. It was first traced to surface outcrops in the Carlsbad, New Mexico area in 1938 and assigned as a member of the (now abandoned) Whitehorse Formation. Dickey raised the unit to formation rank in 1940, when the Whitehorse was raised to group rank. The unit was reassigned to the Artesia Group in 1962.

== See also ==
- List of fossiliferous stratigraphic units in New Mexico
- Paleontology in New Mexico
