= Bell Canyon Formation =

Geologic formation ion New Mexico and Texas, US

- Stratigraphic range: Guadalupian
- Type: Formation
- Unit of: Delaware Mountain Group
- Underlies: Castile Formation
- Overlies: Cherry Canyon Formation
- Thickness: 200–300 m (660–980 ft)

Lithology
- Primary: Sandstone, siltstone
- Other: Limestone

Location
- Coordinates: 31.9359°N 104.7237°W
- Region: New Mexico; Texas
- Country: United States

Type section
- Named for: Bell Canyon
- Named by: DeFord and Lloyd
- Year defined: 1940
- Bell Canyon Formation (the United States) Bell Canyon Formation (Texas)

The Bell Canyon Formation is a geologic formation found in the Delaware Basin of southeastern New Mexico and western Texas. It contains fossils characteristic of the Guadalupian Age of the Permian Period.

== Description ==
The formation consists mostly of marine sandstone and siltstone, but with five interfingering tongues of gray limestone. These extend from the Capitan reef into what was then deep, anoxic water 300–500 meters (980–1,640 ft) deep of the Permian Basin. Total thickness of the formation is 200–300 meters (660–980 ft).

== Fossils ==
The formation's Lamar Limestone Member of Guadalupe Mountains National Park has produced fossil holocephalan teeth.

== History of investigation ==
The unit was first designated as a formation by DeFord and Lloyd in 1940, who raised the Delaware Mountain Formation to group rank and designed its previously informal members as formations.
