= Bone Spring Formation =

Geologic formation in Texas and New Mexico, US

- Stratigraphic range: Kungurian
- Type: Formation
- Underlies: Cutoff Shale
- Thickness: 1,000 m (3,300 ft)

Lithology
- Primary: Limestone
- Other: Shale, sandstone

Location
- Coordinates: 31.8508°N 104.9817°W
- Region: Texas; New Mexico
- Country: United States

Type section
- Named for: Bone Spring Canyon
- Named by: Blanchard and Davis
- Year defined: 1929
- Bone Spring Formation (the United States) Bone Spring Formation (Texas)

The Bone Spring Formation is a geologic formation found in the Delaware Basin in Texas and New Mexico. It preserves fossils dating back to the Leonardian Age of the Permian Period.

== Description ==
The formation consists of dark gray deep marine limestone interbedded with shale and sandstone interpreted as turbidites. The total thickness is about 1,000 meters (3,300 ft). The base of the formation is largely concealed in the subsurface, and the formation is overlain by the Cutoff Shale. The formation grades laterally into the Victorio Peak Formation.

The uppermost shale beds of the formation have been assigned to the Avalon Shale.

== Fossils ==
The formation contains fossils of the brachiopods Productus leonardensis, Marginifera cristobalensis, Pugnoides texanus, P. bidentatus, and Composita mexicana; the ammonites Peritrochia erebus, Paracelites elegans, Agathiceras texanum, and Perrinites.

== History of investigation ==
The formation was first designated the Bone Springs Limestone by Blanchard and Davis in 1929. It has subsequently been demoted to membership as the Bone Canyon Member of the Leonard Formation, renamed the Bone Spring Limestone, and most recently redesigned the Bone Spring Formation. The Cutoff Shale was removed as a separate formation in 1964.

== Economic geology ==
The sandstones of the Bone Spring Formation are important petroleum reservoirs with estimated reserves in 1997 of 300,000–375,000 bbl. The formation lies deep in the subsurface in the Delaware Basin, where its shale facies is known as the Avalon Shale.

== See also ==
- List of fossiliferous stratigraphic units in New Mexico
- List of fossiliferous stratigraphic units in Texas
