= Delaware Basin (disambiguation) =

Delaware Basin could refer to:

- the New Mexico region called the Delaware Basin
- the Delaware Valley called the Philadelphia metropolitan area
- the Delaware River valley
