= Victorio Peak Formation =

Geologic formation between Texas and New Mexico, United States

- Stratigraphic range: Kungurian
- Type: Formation
- Underlies: Cutoff Shale
- Thickness: 1,000 m (3,300 ft)

Lithology
- Primary: Limestone
- Other: Dolomite

Location
- Coordinates: 31.3254°N 104.8798°W
- Region: Texas; New Mexico
- Country: United States

Type section
- Named for: Victorio Peak (Texas)
- Named by: King and King
- Year defined: 1929
- Victorio Peak Formation (the United States) Victorio Peak Formation (Texas)

The Victorio Peak Formation is a geologic formation found in the Delaware Basin in Texas and New Mexico. It preserves fossils dating back to the Leonardian Age of the Permian Period.

== Description ==
The formation consists of light gray limestone and dolomite The total thickness over 1,000 meters (3,300 ft). The base of the formation is largely concealed in the subsurface, and the formation is overlain by the Cutoff Shale. The formation grades laterally to the southeast into the Bone Spring Formation, representing the change from shallow shelf carbonate deposition to deep marine carbonate deposition. To the northwest, the Victorio Peak Formation grades into the Yeso Group and the lower part of the San Andres Formation.

== Fossils ==
The formation contains fossil brachiopods, include Productus ivesii, Dichtyoclostus, and Neospirifer, fusulinids such as Parafusilina, crinoids, corals, and euomphalid gastropods characteristic of the Leonardian.

== History of investigation ==
The formation was first designated the Victorio Peak Member of the (now-abandoned) Leonard Formation by King and King in 1929. It was reassigned as the Victorio Peak Member of the Bone Spring Formation by King in 1942, and finally removed as its own formation by Hay-Roe in 1957.

== See also ==
- List of fossiliferous stratigraphic units in New Mexico
- List of fossiliferous stratigraphic units in Texas
