= Queen Formation =

- Stratigraphic range: Guadalupian
- Type: Formation
- Unit of: Artesia Group
- Underlies: Seven Rivers Formation
- Overlies: San Andres Formation
- Thickness: 500 feet (150 m)

Lithology
- Primary: Sandstone
- Other: dolomite, anhydrite

Location
- Coordinates: 32.191°N 104.755°W
- Region: New Mexico
- Country: United States

Type section
- Named for: Queen Post Office
- Named by: Blanchard and Davis
- Year defined: 1929
- Queen Formation (the United States) Queen Formation (New Mexico)

The Queen Formation is a geologic formation in southeastern New Mexico and west Texas. It preserves fossils dating back to the late Guadalupian Epoch of the Permian period.

== Description ==
The formation consists of up to 500 feet (150 m) of mostly sandstone, with some interbedded dolomite and anhydrite. It rests on the San Andres Formation, from which it is separated by an erosional surface showing karst features. The Queen Formation is overlain by the Seven Rivers Formation. The Queen Formation is part of the Artesia Group, which is interpreted as a sequence of shelf rocks of the Capitan reef.

== History of investigation ==
The unit was first named as the Queen sandstone of the upper San Andres Formation by Grant Blanchard and Morgan Davis in 1929. In 1937, W.B. Lang assigned the Seven Rivers Member to the (now abandoned) Chalk Bluff Formation. The unit was promoted to formation rank and assigned to the Whitehorse Group by Ronald DeFord and Russell Lloyd in 1940. The formation was assigned to the Artesia Group by D.B. Tait and coinvestigators in 1962.

== See also ==
- List of fossiliferous stratigraphic units in New Mexico
- Paleontology in New Mexico

"
