= Artesia Group =

Geologic formation in New Mexico, US

- Stratigraphic range: Kungurian–Guadalupian
- Type: Group
- Sub-units: Grayburg Formation, Queen Formation, Seven Rivers Formation, Yates Formation, Tansill Formation
- Underlies: Triassic units
- Overlies: San Andres Formation
- Thickness: 139–1,710 feet (42–521 m)

Lithology
- Primary: Limestone, dolomite
- Other: Sandstone

Location
- Coordinates: 32.893°N 104.011°W
- Region: New Mexico
- Country: United States

Type section
- Named for: Artesia, New Mexico
- Named by: Tait, Motts, and Spitler
- Year defined: 1962
- Artesia Group (the United States) Artesia Group (New Mexico)

The Artesia Group is a group of geologic formations found in southeastern New Mexico and west Texas. These preserve fossils from the Leonardian to Guadalupian Epochs of the Permian Period.

== Description ==
The Artesia Group is interpreted as a sequence of shelf rocks of the Capitan reef. It shows cyclicity and considerable lateral variation, from carbonate rocks near the Capitan reef, to mixed dolomitic mudstone, evaporites, and sandstones of a lagoon environment further from the reef, to a near-shore environment of evaporites, massive red siltstones, and minor amounts of dolomite.

Formations within the group are, in ascending stratigraphic order, the Grayburg Formation, Queen Formation, Seven Rivers Formation, Yates Formation, and Tansill Formation. The Grayburg and Queen are found furthest north, pinching out north of Las Vegas, New Mexico, with the younger formations pinching out further south. This reflects the retreat of the sea from the area. The formation is prominent in the subsurface near Artesia, New Mexico, where it attains a thickness of 1,710 feet (520 m).

The formation lies atop the San Andres Formation, from which it is separated by an erosional surface showing karst features. It is overlain by various Triassic rock units. In its northernmost exposures, in Glorieta Pass, it is lowered to formation rank.

== History of investigation ==
The group was first named by Tait and coinvestigators in 1962. It largely replaces the abandoned Whitehorse Group and Carlsbad Group. Red beds previously assigned to the Bernal Formation at Glorieta Pass were reassigned to the Artesia Formation by Lucas and Hayden in 1991.

== See also ==
- List of fossiliferous stratigraphic units in New Mexico
- Paleontology in New Mexico
