= Glorieta Sandstone =

Geologic formation in New Mexico, US

- Stratigraphic range: Kungurian
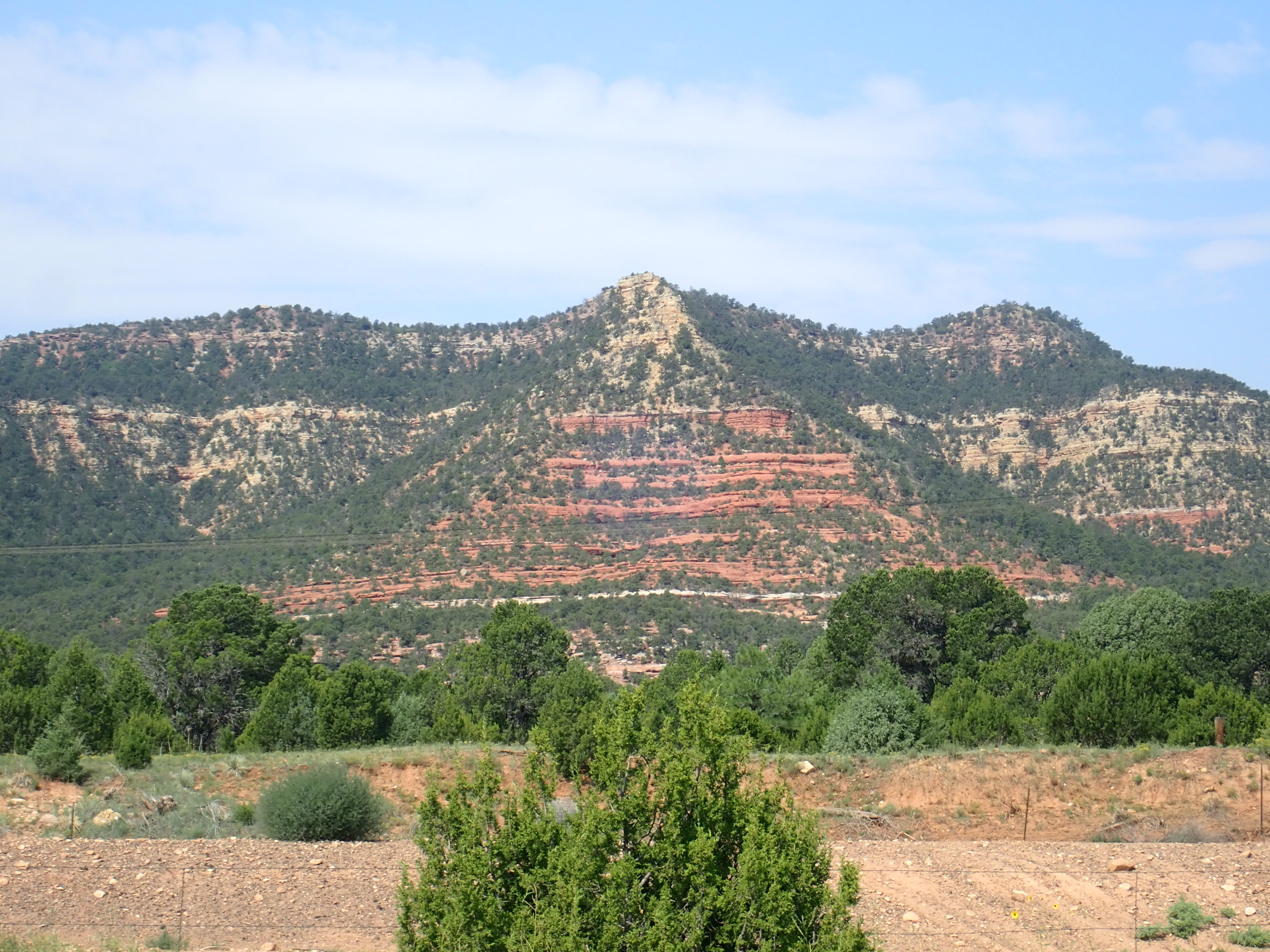
- Glorieta Sandstone type section
- Type: Formation
- Underlies: San Andres Formation
- Overlies: Yeso Group
- Thickness: 81 m (266 ft) (maximum)

Lithology
- Primary: Sandstone

Location
- Coordinates: 35.4938°N 105.6931°W
- Region: New Mexico
- Country: United States

Type section
- Named for: Glorieta Pass
- Named by: Charles Rollin Keyes
- Year defined: 1915
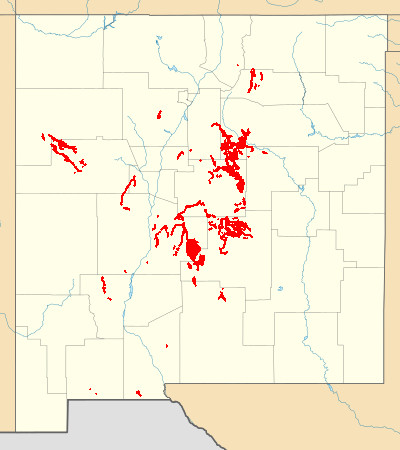
- Glorieta Sandstone (New Mexico) Outcrop map of Glorieta Sandstone in New Mexico with type location indicated

The Glorieta Sandstone is a geologic formation in New Mexico. It preserves fossils characteristic of the Kungurian age of the Permian geology.

== Description ==
The Glorietta Sandstone is a massive yellowish brown to light gray, cliff-forming, fine to medium grained, very mature quartzarenite sandstone that weathers to reddish brown. At the type section, about 33% of the formation is trough-crossbedded sandstone with beds up to 1.3 metres (4.3 feet) thick and with large foresets. Another 27% of the formation is wind-ripple laminated sandstone. Many beds are extremely well cemented. The formation is exposed in most of the flanking uplifts of the Rio Grande Rift and extends in the subsurface to west Texas. It is particularly prominent in Glorieta Pass but extends west to the Jemez Mountains (where it pinches out in the central Nacimiento Mountains) and south to the Socorro area.

The Glorieta Sandstone is of Kungurian (upper Leonardian) age and forms a ledge at or near the top of the Permian section throughout central New Mexico. It rests conformably on the Yeso Group and is overlain either conformably by thin beds of the San Andres Formation or disconformably with Triassic beds. At the type section at Glorieta Pass, is interpreted as a dune field overlain by eolian sheet deposits. Further south, it shows cross stratification suggesting subaqueous deposition, except for local coastal eolian deposition. The presence of forams and herringbone crossbedding also suggests a shallow marine environment.

The Glorieta Sandstone likely correlates with the Coconino Sandstone of Arizona, from which it was separated by the Defiance Uplift. Detrital zircon geochronology suggests that both formations were derived from deflation of an arid transcontinental river system originating in the Appalachian-Ouachita orogen and Canadian Shield with some local sediment sources in the Ancestral Rocky Mountains. However, the Glorieta Sandstone is thinner, with a maximum thickness of less than 90 meters (300 ft) and dune height of 7 meters (23 ft) versus a thickness of 305 meters (1,001 ft) and dune height of 21 meters (69 ft) for the Coconino Sandstone. The Glorieta Sandstone was deposited by trade winds from the northeast while the Coconino Sandstone was deposited by onshore winds from the north and northwest. Tongues of the Glorieta Sandstone are found up to 150 kilometres (93 miles) southward into the San Andres Formation, and marine carbonate beds within the Glorieta Sandstone record repeated northward marine transgressions.

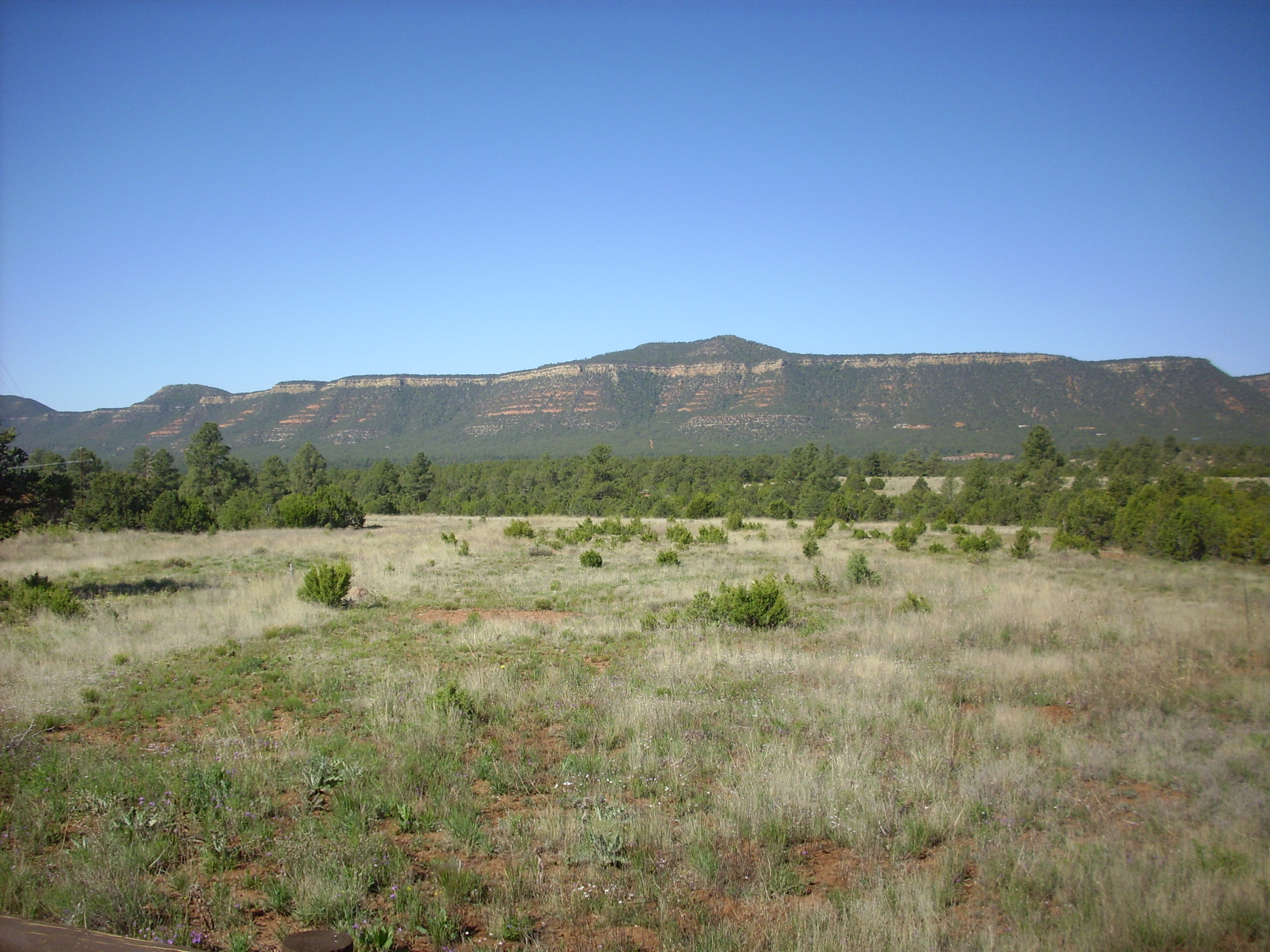
Another view of the Glorieta Formation (upper white beds) at Glorieta Mesa.

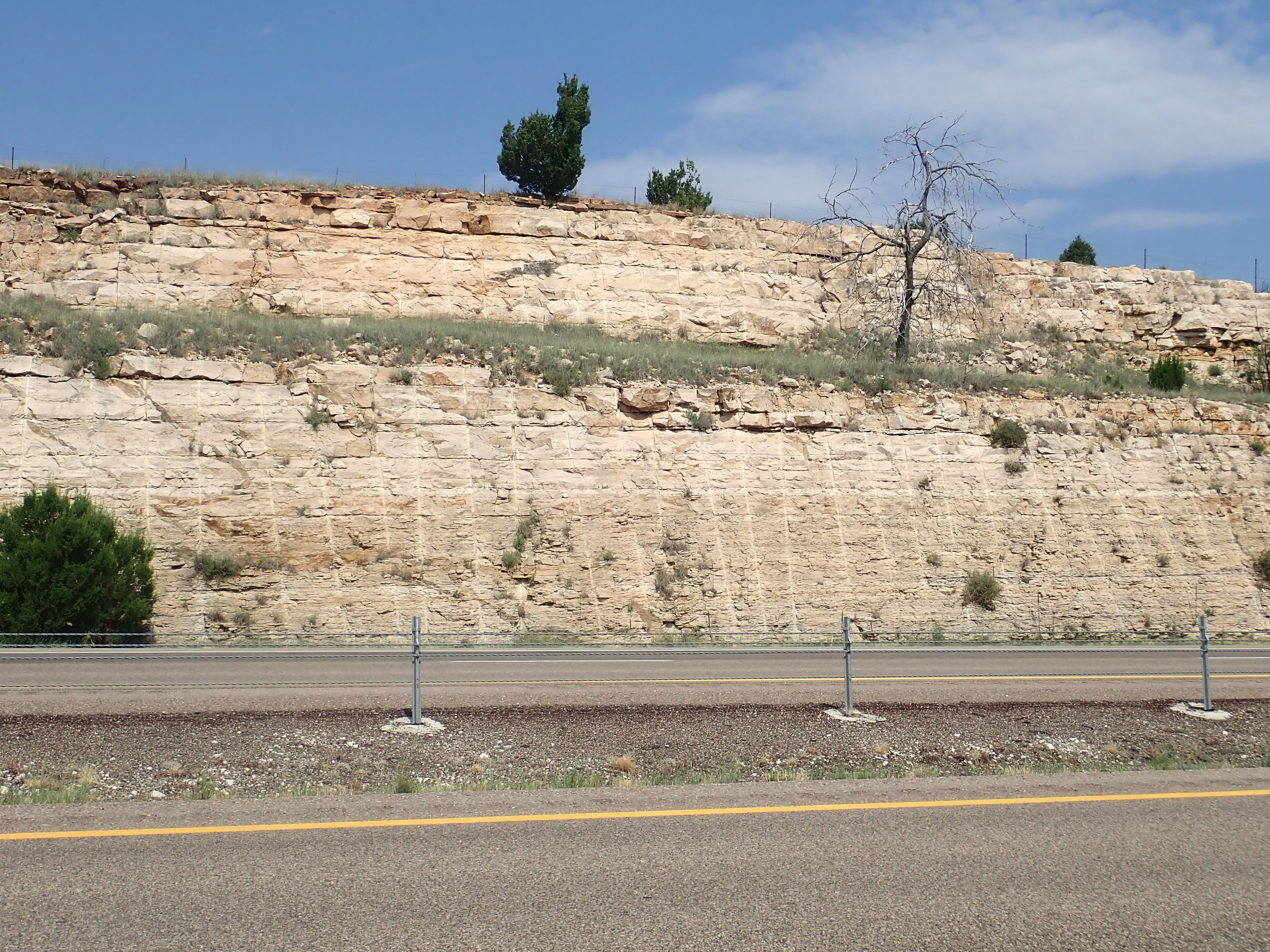
Road cut in the Glorieta Sandstone along I-25 near Bernal.

== History of investigation ==
Keyes first named the formation in 1915, mistaking it for a local tongue of the Dakota Formation. It was long considered either the uppermost member of the Yeso Formation or the lowermost member of the San Andres Formation but was raised to formation rank in 1943.
