= Polytylites =

Polytylites Temporal range: Carboniferous-Permian

Scientific classification
- Kingdom: Animalia
- Phylum: Arthropoda
- Clade: Pancrustacea
- Class: Ostracoda
- Order: Palaeocopida
- Suborder: †Beyrichicopina
- Family: †Amphissitidae
- Genus: †Polytylites

Extinct genus of seed shrimp

Polytylites is an extinct genus of ostracod (seed shrimp) belonging to the order Palaeocopida and family Amphissitidae. Specimens have been found in beds of Carboniferous to Permian age in North America and Asia.

== Species ==
- Polytylites ambitus Cooper 1941
- Polytylites concavus Croneis and Bristol
- Polytylites crassus Cooper 1941
- Polytylites directus Cooper 1941
- Polytylites diversus Cooper 1941
- Polytylites grovei Croneis and Gutke
- Polytylites kitanipponica Ishizaki 1964
- Polytylites oblongus Hoare and Mapes 2000
- Polytylites reticulatus Cooper 1941
- Polytylites similis Croneis and Gale
- Polytylites simplex Hou 1954
- Polytylites sublineatus Croneis and Thurman
- Polytylites tricollinus Jones and Kirkby
- Polytylites trilobus Croneis and Gale
