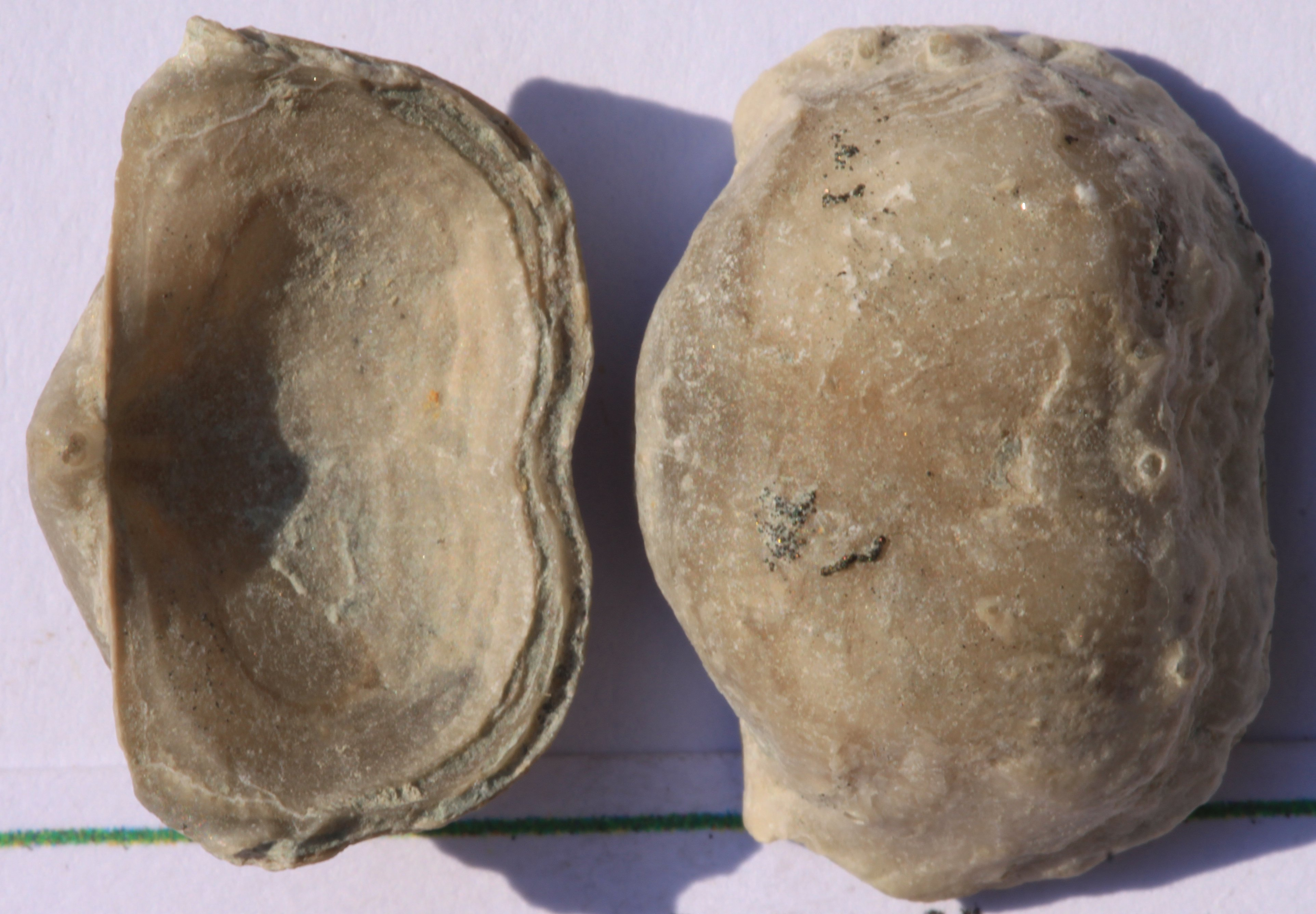
- M. lasallenus

Scientific classification
- Kingdom: Animalia
- Phylum: Brachiopoda
- Class: †Strophomenata
- Order: †Productida
- Tribe: †Marginiferini
- Genus: †Marginifera; Waagen 1884

Species
- See text

= Marginifera =

Marginifera Temporal range: Carboniferous-Triassic

Extinct genus of brachiopod

Marginifera is an extinct genus of brachiopod belonging to the order Productida. Specimens have been found in Carboniferous to Triassic beds in Asia, Europe, Madagascar, and North America.

== Species ==
- M. altimontana Sestini 1965
- M. andreai Angiolini 1995
- M. bicostala Lee and Gu 1980
- M. brevisulcata Cooper 1957
- M. carniolica Schellwien 1900
- M. costellata Cooper 1957
- M. elongatoides Zeng et al. 1995
- M. ganota Grant 1993
- M. gobiensis Chao 1927
- M. haydenensis Girty 1903
- M. hubeiensis Ni 1977
- M. involuta Tschernyschew 1902
- M. jalaidensis Lee and Gu 1980
- M. juresanensis Tschernyschew 1902
- M. lebedevi Tschernyschew 1902
- M. longispina Sowerby 1814
- M. madagascariensis Astre 1934
- M. magniplicata Huang 1932
- M. minor King 1931
- M. morrisi Chao 1927
- M. multicostellata Cooper 1957
- M. nathorstfjordensis Dunbar 1955
- M. nesiotes Grant 1976
- M. orvini Frebold 1942
- M. parahimalayensis Lee and Gu 1980
- M. planocosta Easton 1962
- M. popovkaensis Zavodowsky 1968
- M. profundosulcata Cooper 1957
- M. qaganqulutica Lee and Gu 1980
- M. qamarensis Yanagida and Pillevuit 1994
- M. rimuensisMerla 1934
- M. schartimiensiformis Lapina 1960
- M. schellwieni Tschernyschew 1902
- M. semigratiosa Reed 1927
- M. septentrionalis Tschernyschew 1902
- M.sexcostata Licharew 1937
- M. spinulifera Campi and Shi 2007
- M. tetraspina Lee and Duan 1985
- M. timanica Tschernyschew 1902
- M. unsulcata Li 1986
- M. uralica Tschernyschew 1889
- M. yanhuensis Sun 1991
- M. zhongbaensis Jin and Sun 1981
