= Yeso Group =

Group of geologic formations in New Mexico, US

- Stratigraphic range: Kungurian
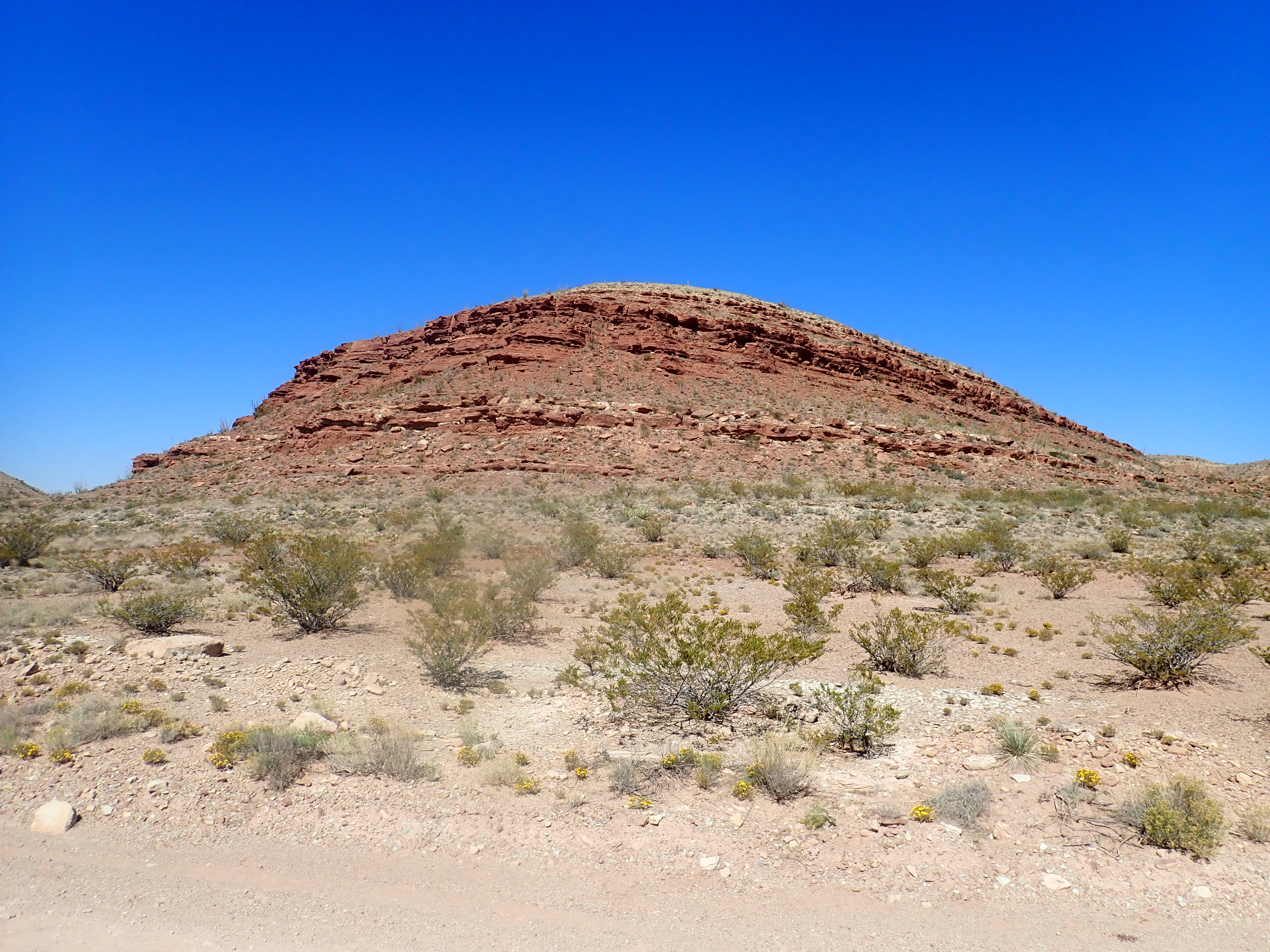
- Yeso Group at its type location northeast of Socorro, New Mexico, USA
- Type: Group
- Sub-units: See text
- Underlies: Glorieta Sandstone
- Overlies: Abo Formation
- Thickness: Up to 309 m (1,014 ft)

Lithology
- Primary: Sandstone
- Other: Gypsum

Location
- Coordinates: 34.1659°N 106.7465°W
- Approximate paleocoordinates: 4.8°N 34.4°W
- Region: New Mexico
- Country: United States

Type section
- Named for: Mesa del Yeso
- Named by: W.T. Lee
- Year defined: 1909
- Coordinates: 34.2017512°N 106.7754422°W
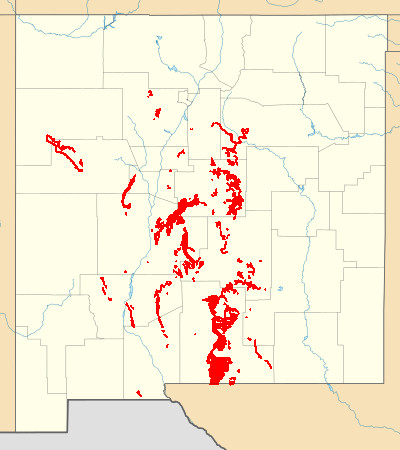
- Yeso Group (New Mexico)

The Yeso Group is a group of geologic formations in New Mexico. It contains fossils characteristic of the Kungurian Age of the early Permian Period.

== Description ==
The Yeso Group is lithologically complex, ranging from marine shelf carbonate rock to the south through shoreline and sabkha beds to eolian dune and sheet sand deposits to the north. It is exposed in the mountains and other uplifts bordering the Rio Grande Rift and in the Pecos River valley. It is present in the subsurface in the Raton Basin. The group records a major marine transgression from the south during the early Leonardian (Kungurian).

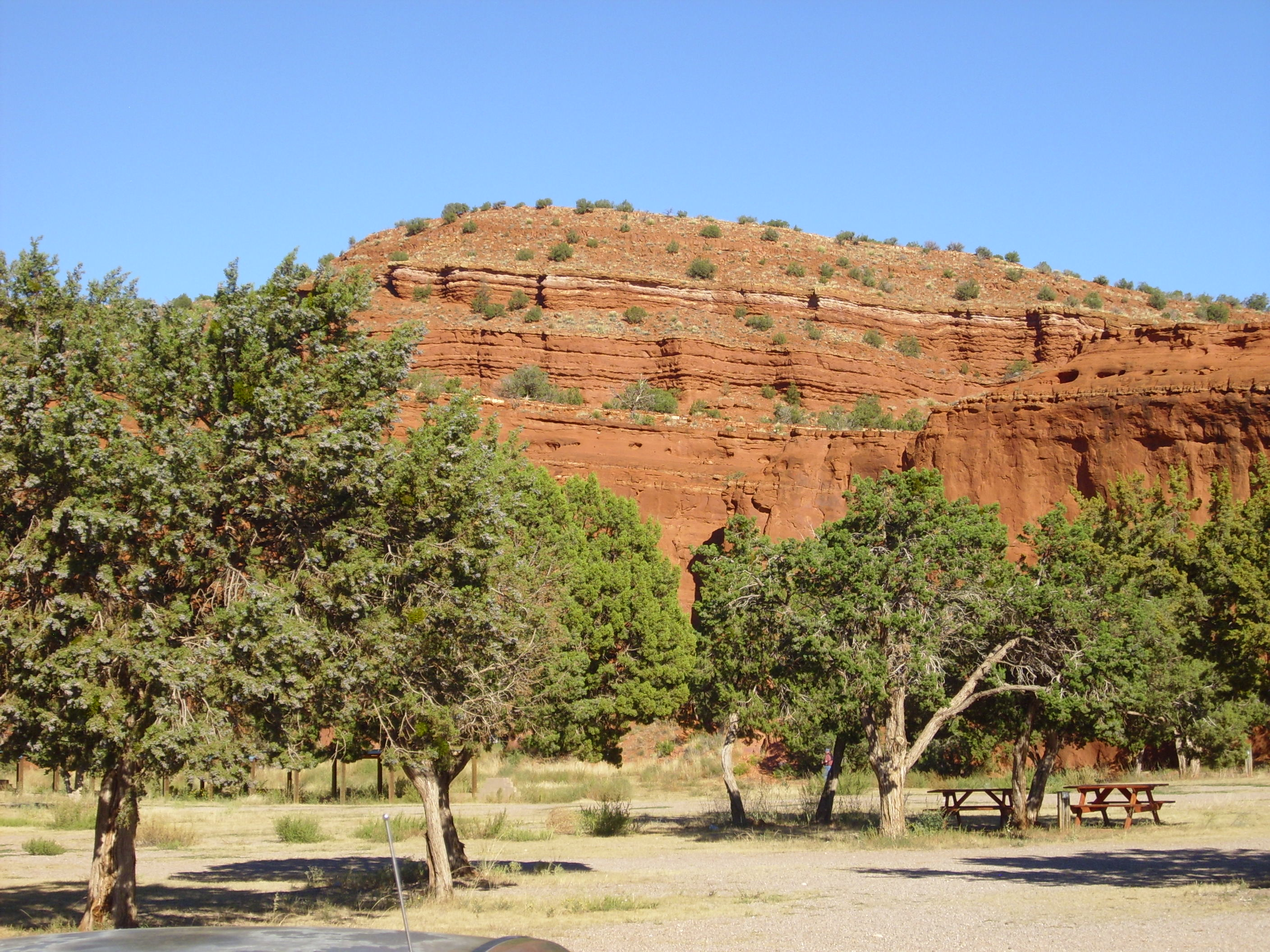
Yeso Group outcrop at Red Rocks, New Mexico

In the Jemez Mountains, the group consists of massive cross-bedded lower beds (De Chelly Sandstone) and thinner upper beds (San Ysidro Formation) suggesting a more fluvial depositional environment. The Yeso Group is exposed extensively in the Jemez Mountains, but pinches out in the northern Jemez, delineating the northern limit of the dune field from which it arose.

Farther south, the group is divided into the Arroyo de Alamillo and Los Vallos Formations. It transitions from continental to shallow marine in character from north to south, with the lithology changing from eolian and sand sheet deposits in the north to sabkha deposits of gypsum and carbonate rock to the south. Thus the Arroyo de Alamillo Formation is siltstone, ripple-laminated sandstone, and lesser dolomitic limestone, in contrast with the eolian beds of the De Chelly Formation, and the Los Vallos Formation is 42% sandstone, 28% siltstone, and 24% gypsum, in contrast with the thinly bedded sandstone of the San Ysidro Formation.

The Los Vallos Formation is divided into the Torres, Cañas and Joyita Members. At Abo Pass in central New Mexico, the Torres is 180 metres (590 ft) of gypsiferous siliclastic sedimentary rock and gypsum with minor dolomite; the Cañas is 16 to 52 metres (52 to 171 ft) of mostly gypsum; and the Joyita Member is 21 metres (69 ft) of redbed sandstone.

The group is conformable with both the underlying Abo Formation and the overlying Glorieta Sandstone.

== Fossil content ==
The Yeso Group is largely devoid of fossils. However, continued field work has gradually built up a record of marine microfossils, mostly algae and foraminiferans, trace fossils (including tetrapod footprints), and terrestrial plant fossils. In 2018, a mold of an incomplete, articulated skeleton of a eupelycosaur was discovered in lower Yeso strata. The microfossils date the Yeso Group to the Kungurian.

Tetrapod trackways have been found in the De Chelly Sandstone in the Lucero uplift. These are too poorly preserved for precise classification.

== Economic geology ==
Carbon dioxide was produced from subsurface Yeso beds in the Bueyeros, New Mexico field. Production was limited from 1931 to 1980, but increased demand for carbon dioxide for enhanced oil recovery led to construction of pipelines to the Permian Basin. Production totaled 3.3 trillion ft^{3} by 2018, with an estimated 5 to 10 trillion ft^{3} still recoverable. Isotope studies suggest the carbon dioxide originated in the Earth's mantle and the Yeso Group is merely a reservoir rock. Carbon dioxide accumulates in the Tubb Sandstone Member (sometimes also known as the Drinkard Sandstone) and is capped by the Cimarron Anhydrite Member.

== History of investigation ==
The unit was designated as the Yeso Formation of the (now-abandoned) Manzano Group by W.T. Lee in 1909 for Mesa del Yeso, a small mesa 12 miles northeast of Socorro, New Mexico. Darton redesignated it as a member of the Chupadera Formation in 1922, but Needham and Bates returned it to its original designation as a formation within the Manzano Group in 1943. Needham and Bates also removed the Glorieta Sandstone from the formation.

Kelley and Wood divided the formation into members in 1946, including the lowermost Mesita Blanca Member. Baars pointed out in 1962 that the Meseta Blanca Member is indistinguishable from the De Chelly Sandstone, but this redesignation was not widely accepted until the stratigraphic revisions of Lucas et al. in 2005, which also raised the formation to group rank. The promotion of the Yeso Formation to group rank and the abandonment of the Meseta Blanca Member remains controversial.
