= Capitan Formation =

Geologic formation in Texas and New Mexico

- Stratigraphic range: Guadalupian
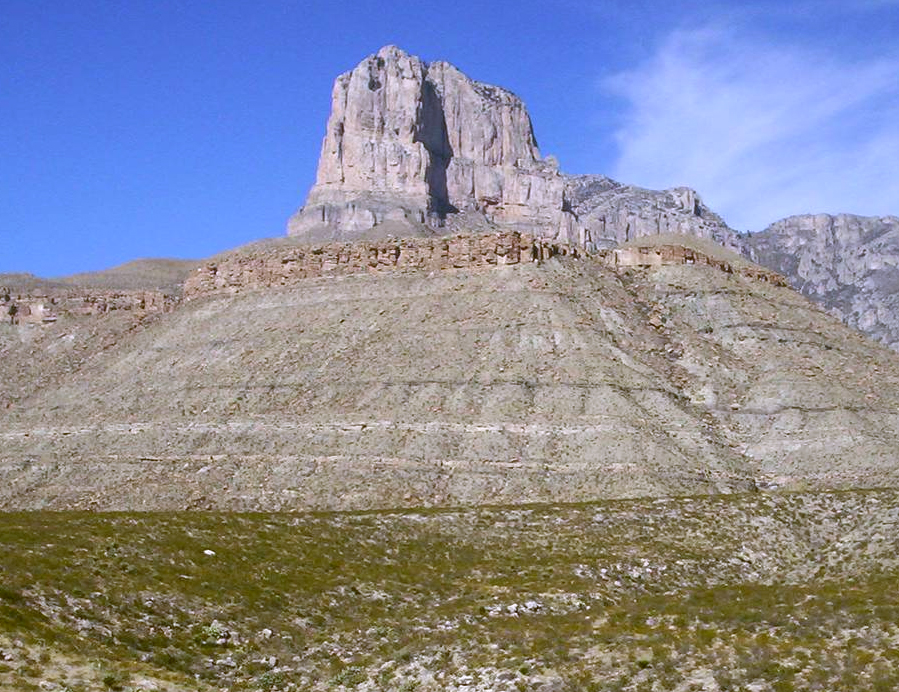
- The Capitan Formation underlies El Capitan in Guadalupe Mountains National Park.
- Type: Formation
- Underlies: Artesia Group, Castile Formation
- Overlies: Goat Seep Dolomite, Delaware Mountain Group
- Thickness: 1,800 ft (550 m)

Lithology
- Primary: Limestone
- Other: dolomite

Location
- Coordinates: 31.8773°N 104.8668°W
- Region: Texas; New Mexico
- Country: United States

Type section
- Named for: El Capitan Peak
- Named by: G.B. Richardson
- Year defined: 1904
- Capitan Formation (the United States) Capitan Formation (Texas)

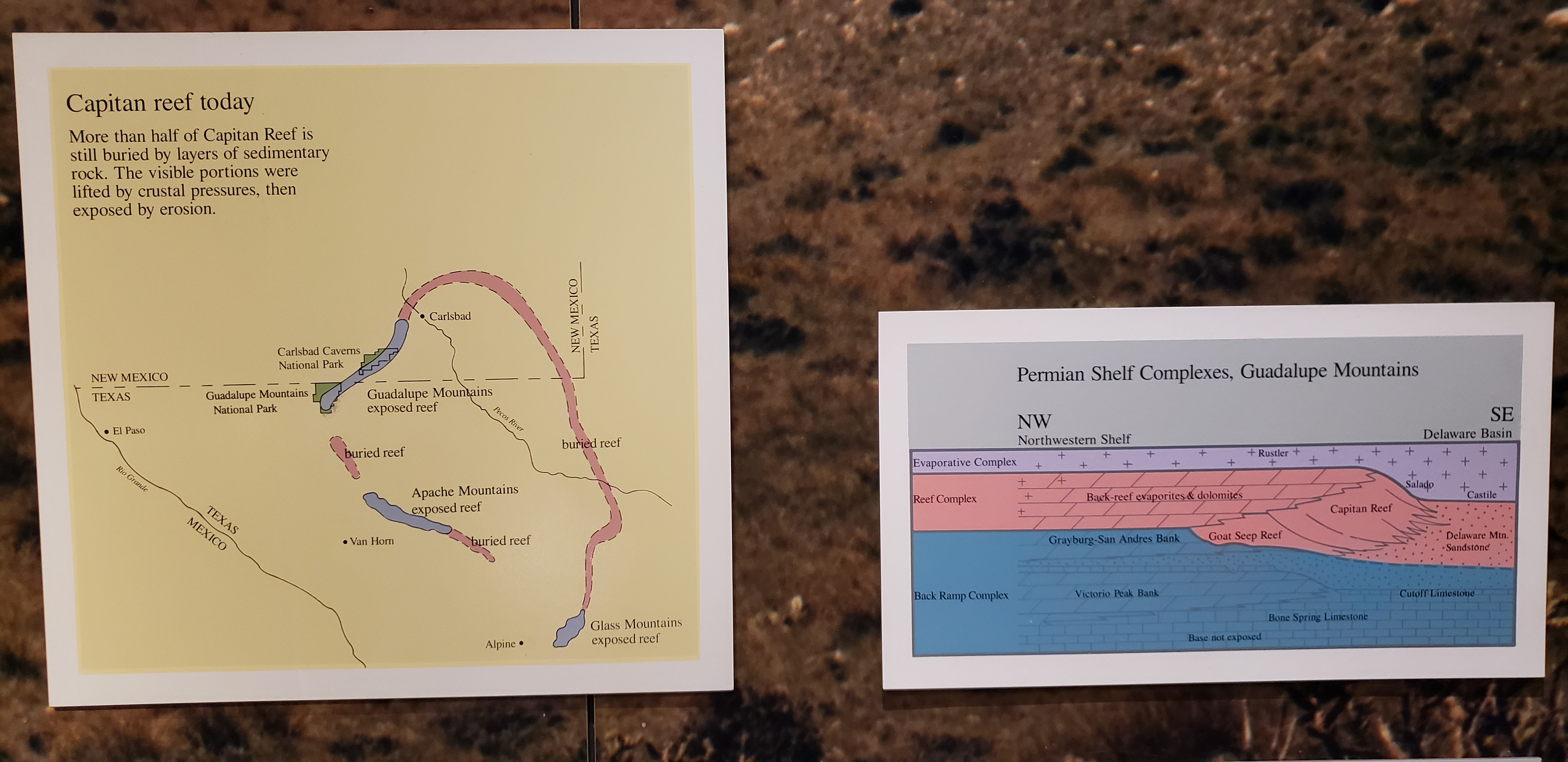
Capitan Reef in Guadalupe Mountains National Park

The Capitan Formation is a geologic formation found in western Texas and southeastern New Mexico. It is a fossilized reef dating to the Guadalupian Age of the Permian period.

The formation underlies El Capitan in Guadalupe Mountains National Park, and the formation and its associated basin, shelf margin, and backreef formations have been described as "the largest, best-preserved, most accessible, and most intensively studied Paleozoic reef complex in the world."

== History of investigation ==
The Guadalupe Mountains were first described in the reports of 1849 and 1850 United States military expeditions to the area. George Shumard was the first geologist to study the area, in 1855, and described an "upper white limestone" containing fossils. These included fusulinids and brachiopods, that were identified correctly by his brother, B.F. Shumard, as Permian in age. However, debate on whether the beds were Carboniferous or Permian in age continued until at least 1920. The work of Darton and Reeside in 1926 established the accepted framework for the stratigraphy of the area, and identified the Capitan Formation as late Permian in age.

The Capitan Formation itself was first named by G.B. Richardson in 1904 for exposures in the Guadalupe Mountains. Richardson was impressed by the great mass of seemingly uniform limestone, forming vertical cliffs over 1,000 feet (300 m) tall, and noted that much of the limestone was dolomitized. He was also impressed with the abundant fossils found in the middle beds of the formation, forming a fossil assemblage unlike anything else known at that time. Richardson interpreted the Guadalupe Mountains as an east-dipping monocline with a fault on the steep western boundary, and believed El Capitan itself was a product of erosion.

Interest in the formation was rekindled by the discovery in May 1923 of the Big Lake oil field in Texas and the drilling of the first commercial oil well in southeastern New Mexico in 1924. This culminated in the publication by E. Russell Lloyd in 1929 of his interpretation of the Capitan Limestone and associated formations as a gigantic fossil coral reef. Lloyd traced the reef nearly to Carlsbad and noted that the dissimilarity of the formations on the two sides of the reef, now known as the basin and backreef shelf facies. Two months later, a “Symposium on Pennsylvanian and Permian stratigraphy of southwestern United States” appeared in the August, 1929 issue of the Bulletin of the American Association of Petroleum Geologists, which provided a flood of new details on the Capitan reef.

As part of that symposium, Philip B. King and R.E. King presented their conclusion that the Tessey, Gilliam, and Vidrio Limestones of the Glass Mountains of west Texas were correlative with the Capitan Formation, and redesigned them as members of the formation. However, by 1937, King had concluded that the Tessey Limestone was not part of the Capital Formation and removed it as a member. By 1942 he had restricted the definition of the Capitan Formation to reef limestone, consistent with the stratigraphic conventions in the Guadalupe Mountains, and removed the Gilliam and most of the Vidrio Limestone from the formation.

== Description ==
The Capitan Formation consists of compact, massive, light grey to white limestone with minor dolomite. Its total thickness is 1,000–2,000 feet (300–610 m). On the backreef side of the formation, the Capitan rests on the Goat Seep Dolomite and grades into and is overlain by the Artesia Group, while on the basin side, the Capitan rests on the Delaware Mountain Group and is overlain by the Castile Formation. The formation thus forms a narrow belt curving around the western side of the Delaware Basin that interfingers with backreef formations on the northwestern to southwestern side and with basin formations on the southeastern to northeastern side.

The formation is a giant fossil reef, extending at least from the Carlsbad area to the Glass Mountains of Texas. At its greatest development, the reef may have been built up to 200–300 feet (61–91 m) above the sea floor.

== Fossils ==
Richardson (1904) found that the upper and lower beds of the formation were relatively unfossiliferous, but the middle section contained an abundant fossil assemblage unlike any other known at that time.

=== Fusulinida ===
- Fusulina elongata

=== Porifera ===
- Numerous species

=== Anthozoa ===
- A few species

=== Bryozoa ===
- Acanthocladia
- Goniocladia

=== Brachiopoda ===
- Streptorhynchus
- Orthotetes
- Geyerella
- Orthothetina
- Chonetes
- Productus occidentalis
- P. subhotridus
- P. popei
- P. mexicanus
- Marginifera pileolus
- Spirifer mexicanus
- Spirifer sev sp.
- Martinia
- Squamularia guadalupensis
- Ambocoelia
- Spiriferina billingsi
- Hustedia meekana
- Pugnax swallowiana
- Rhynchonella indentata
- Terebratuloids
- Leptodus
- Richthofenia permiana

=== Mollusca ===
- Schizodus securas
- Aviculopecten
- Lima
- Camptonectes
- Streblopteria
- Myalina squamosa
- Myoconcha
- Indeterminate gastropods

King found that the Vidrio Limestone Member had been highly dolomitized, destroying most of its fossil contents, but he recognized fossils of coralline algae, cup corals, crinoid stems, fusulinids, echinoid spines, and brachiopods.

== See also ==
- List of fossiliferous stratigraphic units in Texas
- Paleontology in Texas
