= San Andres Formation, United States =

Geologic formation in New Mexico and Texas

San Andres Formation
- Stratigraphic range: Kungurian
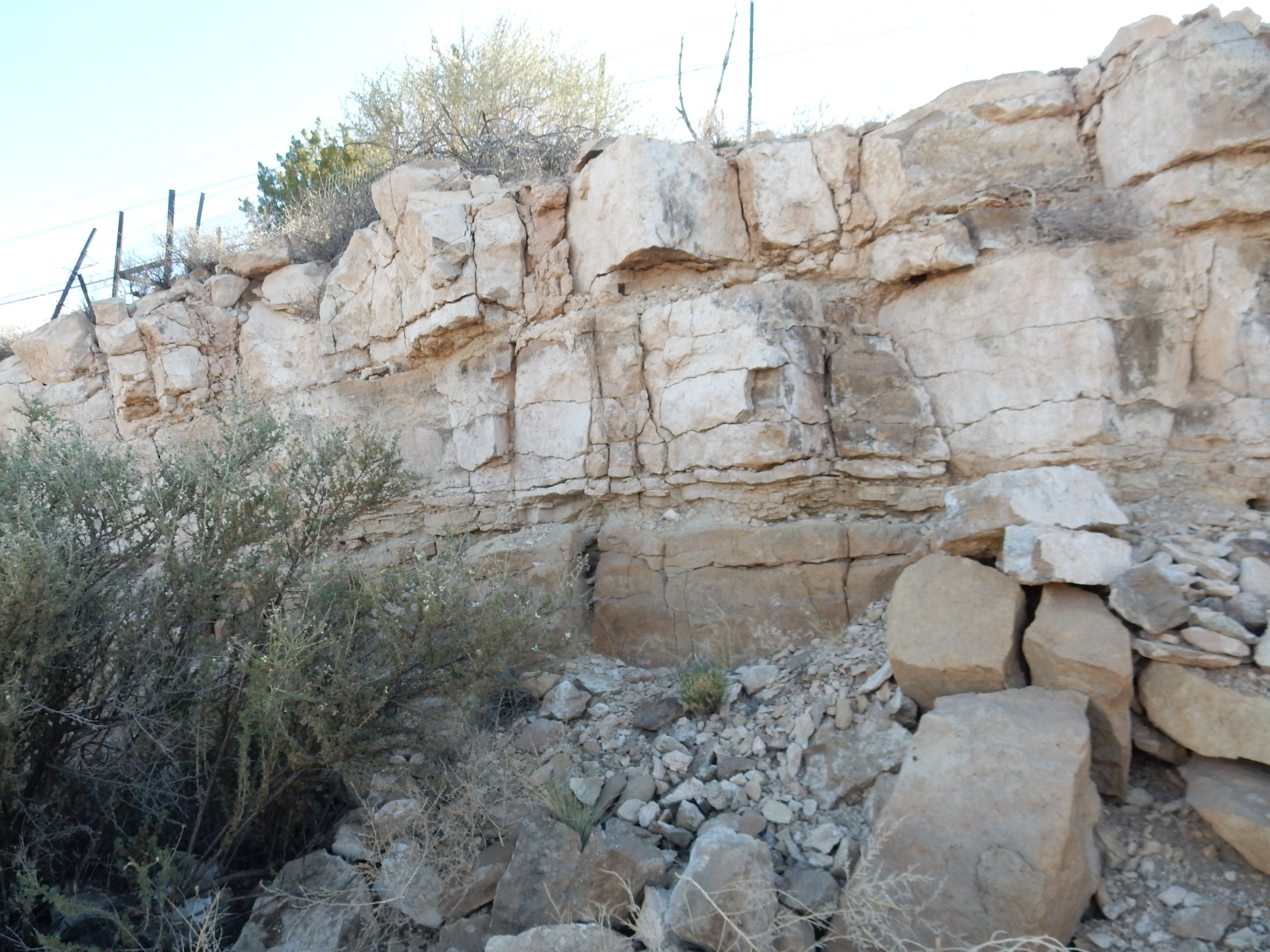
- San Andres Formation near El Malpais National Monument
- Type: Formation
- Sub-units: Bonney Canyon & Fourmile Draw Members
- Underlies: Grayburg Formation
- Overlies: Glorieta & Yeso Formations
- Thickness: 400 m (1,300 ft)

Lithology
- Primary: Limestone
- Other: Dolomite, sandstone

Location
- Coordinates: 33.236°N 106.760°W
- Approximate paleocoordinates: 4.4°N 33.5°W
- Region: Texas; New Mexico
- Country: United States
- Extent: San Juan Basin (subsurface); San Andres, Zuni & Sangre de Cristo Mountains (outcrop)

Type section
- Named for: San Andres Mountains
- Named by: W.T. Lee
- Year defined: 1909
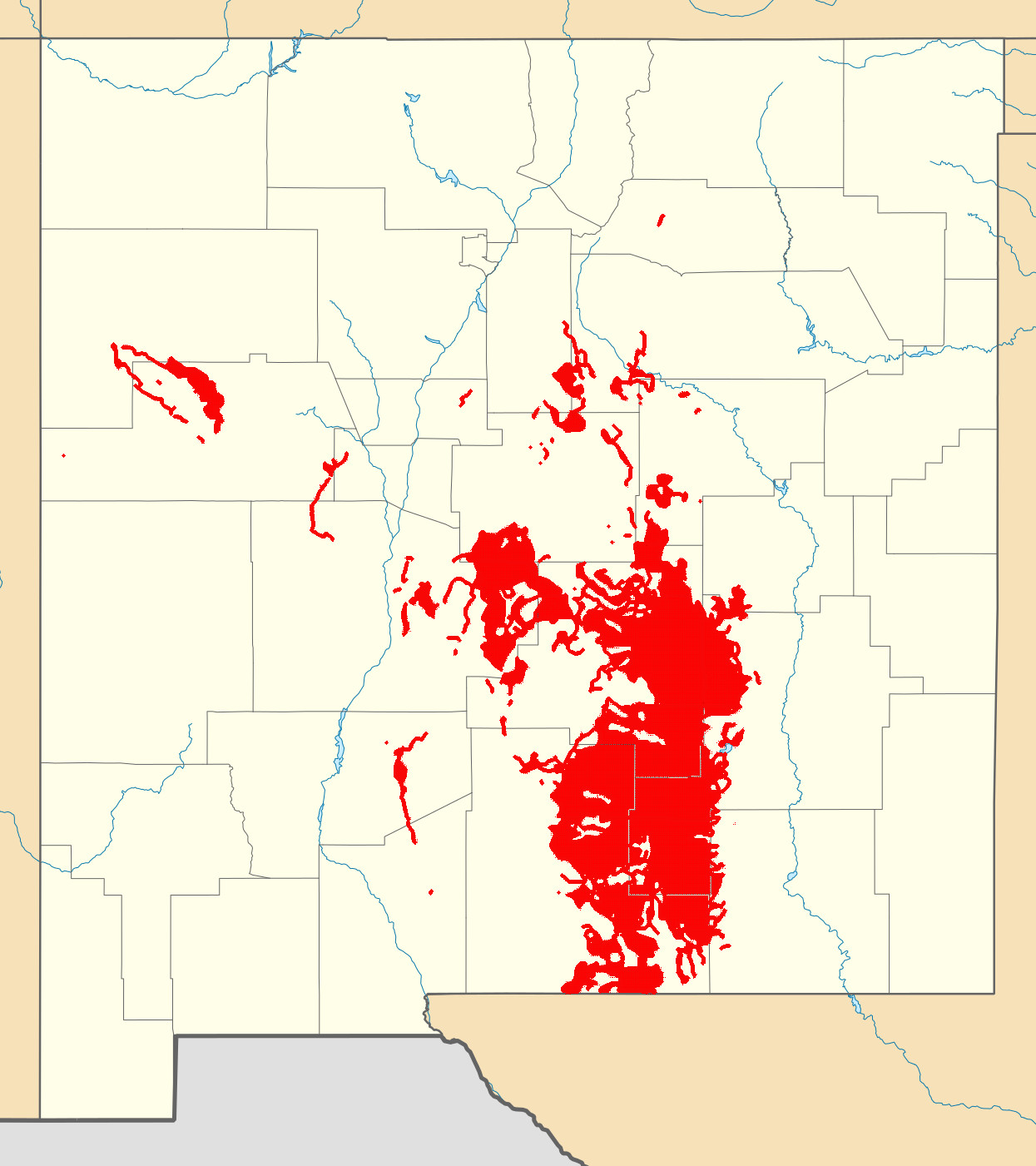
- San Andres Formation, United States (New Mexico)

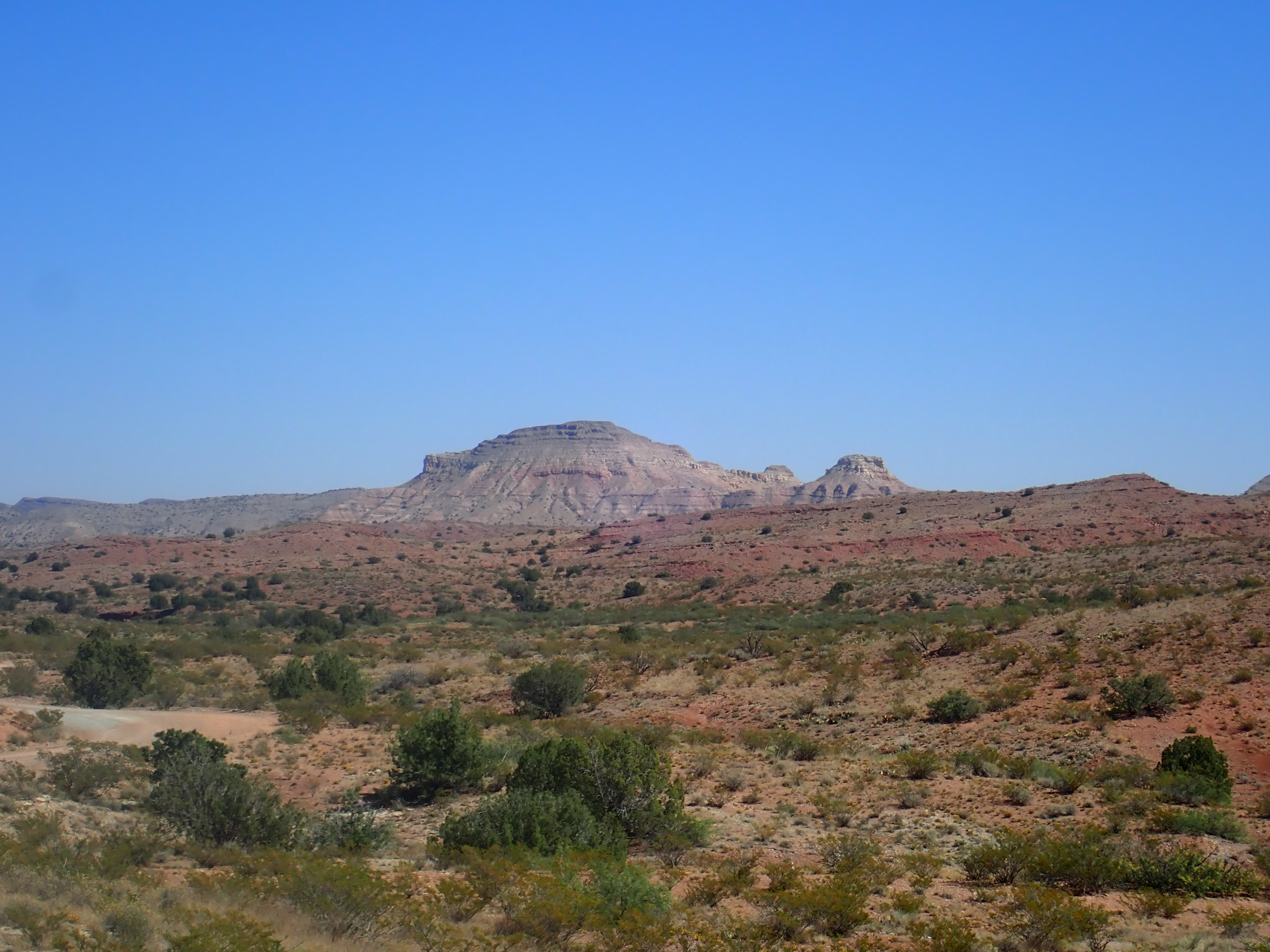
San Andres Formation caps Sierra de la Cruz northeast of Socorro, New Mexico, USA

The San Andres Formation is a geologic formation found in New Mexico and Texas. It contains fossils characteristic of the late Leonardian (Kungurian) Age) of the Permian Period.

The formation is the most widely exposed Paleozoic formation in the state of New Mexico, cropping out in a zone 80–110 kilometers (50–68 miles) wide that extends from west Texas to central New Mexico and with additional exposures in the Zuni Mountains and Sangre de Cristo Mountains. It is also prominent in the subsurface in the San Juan Basin and in eastern New Mexico.

== Description ==
The formation consists mostly of massive marine limestone. The limestone is typically cherty and poorly fossiliferous, but fossils are locally abundant. The total thickness is up to 400 meters (1,300 ft).

The formation is transitional with the underlying Glorieta Sandstone or Yeso Group. Where the basal sandstone beds are a minor component compared with marine limestone, these beds are assigned to the Rio Bonito Member of the San Andres Formation and no Glorieta Sandstone is mapped. Where the basal sandstones contain little or no marine limestone, the lower beds are mapped as Glorieta Sandstone and no Rio Bonito Member is mapped. This transition from clastic to marine beds represents a late Leonardian marine transgression that was the last to reach northern New Mexico for the next 150 million years. The remaining members are the Bonney Canyon Member, a relatively thin section of thin-bedded limestone with local gypsum beds, and the upper Fourmile Draw Member, which is primarily marine carbonates. The Fourmile Draw grades into the Brushy Canyon and Cherry Canyon Formations in the Delaware Basin and contains considerable gypsum in the Guadalupe Mountains. The entire San Andres Formation tends to become more dolomitic to the north.

The formation is conformably overlain by the Grayburg Formation or, where this is not present, unconformably by Triassic units.

== Fossil content ==
The formation contains fossils of the gastropod Euomphalus, the scaphopods Plagioglypia canna and Dentalium mexicanam, and the bivalve Aviculipinna.

== History of investigation ==
The beds making up this unit were first identified as an unfossiliferous limestone overlying the Manzano Group by Herrick in 1900. Herrick did not include the beds in the Manzano Group, but in 1909, W.H. Lee mistakenly concluded that it contained fossils indicating a Pennsylvanian age and added the formation to the Manzano Group, designated a type area at the northern end of the San Andres Mountains. However, when Boese established that the upper Manzano Group was actually Permian in age in 1920, the Manzano Group was abandoned and the San Andres Formation was assigned to the late Permian.

In 1922, N.H. Darton reported that the Yeso Formation and San Andres Formation were lithologically indistinguishable at some locations, and lowered both to member rank within his new Chupadera Formation. The Picacho Limestone of the Pecos River valley was correlated with the San Andres Formation by Lang in 1937, who abandoned the Picacho Limestone as a formation name. By 1937 the San Andres was being recognized as an important unit in the subsurface in eastern New Mexico and west Texas.

In 1942, P.B. King advocated for abandoning the Chupadera Formation and restoring the San Andres to formation rank. Needham and Bates formally designated a type section in 1943, at the same time removing the Glorieta Sandstone from the formation. V.C. Kelley divided the formation into members in 1971.

== See also ==
- List of fossiliferous stratigraphic units in New Mexico
- List of fossiliferous stratigraphic units in Texas
- Paleontology in New Mexico
- Paleontology in Texas
