= Brushy Canyon Formation =

The Brushy Canyon Formation is a Permian geologic unit in Guadalupe Mountains National Park. The formation contains fan sandstones that were deposited under ancient seawater during the Middle Permian. These rocks contain abundant fish fossils like sharks' teeth preserved within small phosphatic nodules.
