= Anhydrite =

Mineral, anhydrous calcium sulfate

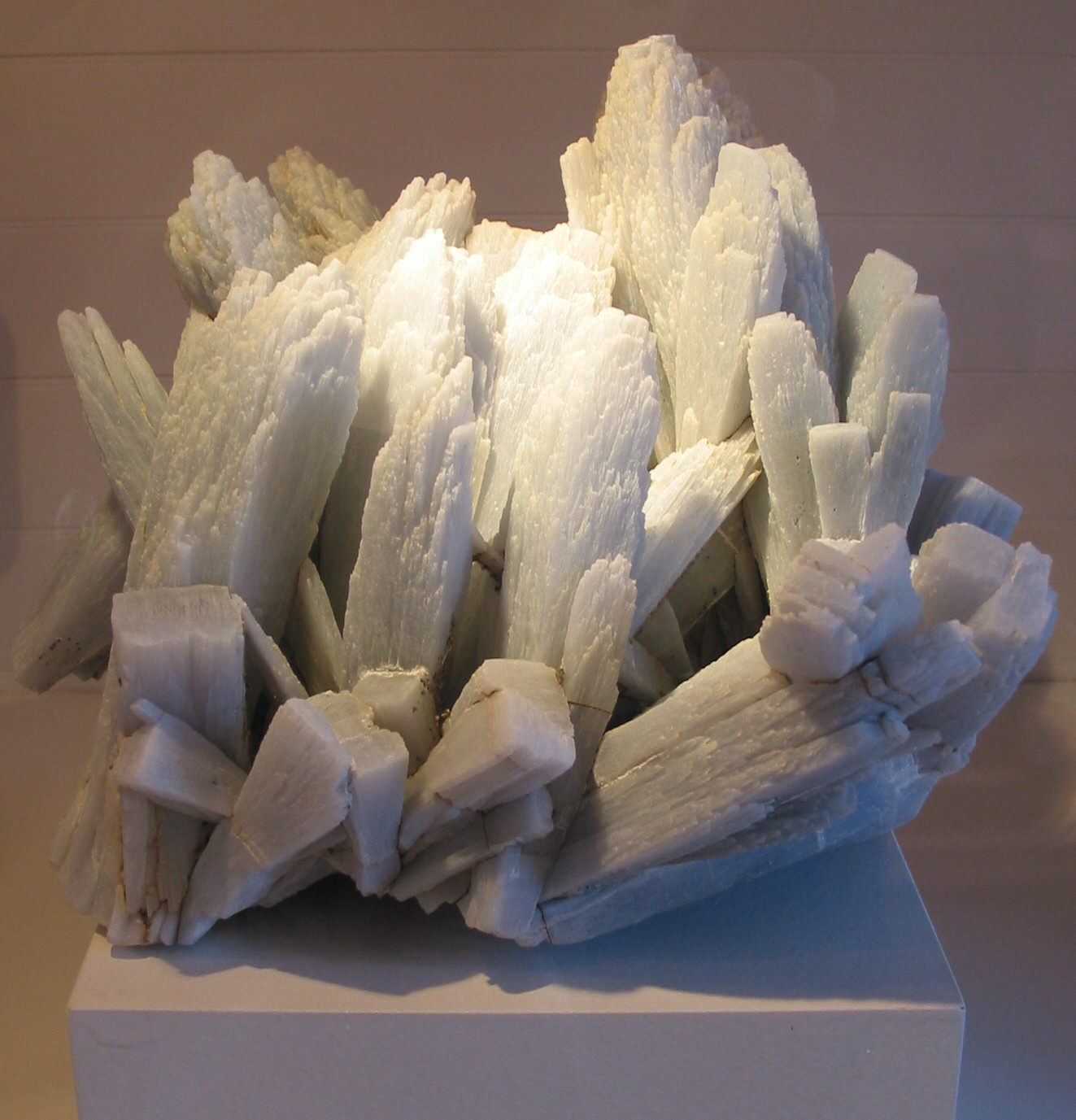
- Anhydrite, from Chihuahua, Mexico

General
- Category: Sulfate mineral
- Formula: CaSO_{4}
- IMA symbol: Anh
- Strunz classification: 7.AD.30
- Dana classification: 28.3.2.1
- Crystal system: Orthorhombic
- Crystal class: Dipyramidal (mmm); H–M symbol: (2/m 2/m 2/m)
- Space group: Amma
- Unit cell: a = 6.245(1) Å, b = 6.995(2) Å c = 6.993(2) Å; Z = 4

Identification
- Color: Colorless to pale blue or violet if transparent; white, mauve, rose, pale brown or gray from included impurities
- Crystal habit: Rare tabular and prismatic crystals. Usually occurs as fibrous, parallel veins that break off into cleavage fragments. Also occurs as grainy, massive, or nodular masses
- Twinning: Simple or repeatedly on {011} common; contact twins rare on {120}
- Cleavage: [010] perfect [100] perfect [001] good, resulting in pseudocubic fragments
- Fracture: Conchoidal
- Tenacity: Brittle
- Mohs scale hardness: 3.5
- Luster: Pearly on {010} vitreous to greasy on {001} vitreous on {100}
- Streak: White
- Diaphaneity: Transparent to translucent
- Specific gravity: 2.97
- Optical properties: Biaxial (+)
- Refractive index: n_{α} = 1.567–1.574 n_{β} = 1.574–1.579 n_{γ} = 1.609–1.618
- Birefringence: δ = 0.042–0.044
- Pleochroism: For violet varieties X = colorless to pale yellow or rose Y = pale violet or rose Z = violet.
- 2V angle: 56–84°
- Fusibility: 2
- Other characteristics: Some specimens fluoresce; many more fluoresce after heating

Anhydrite, or anhydrous calcium sulfate, is a mineral with the chemical formula CaSO_{4}. It is in the orthorhombic crystal system, with three directions of perfect cleavage parallel to the three planes of symmetry. It is not isomorphous with the orthorhombic barium (baryte) and strontium (celestine) sulfates, as might be expected from the chemical formulas. Distinctly developed crystals are somewhat rare, the mineral usually presenting the form of cleavage masses. The Mohs hardness is 3.5, and the specific gravity is 2.9. The color is white, sometimes greyish, bluish, or purple. On the best developed of the three cleavages, the lustre is pearly; on other surfaces it is glassy. When exposed to water, anhydrite readily transforms to the more commonly occurring gypsum, (CaSO_{4}·2H_{2}O) by the absorption of water. This transformation is reversible, with gypsum or calcium sulfate hemihydrate forming anhydrite by heating to around 200 °C (400 °F) under normal atmospheric conditions. Anhydrite is commonly associated with calcite, halite, and sulfides such as galena, chalcopyrite, molybdenite, and pyrite in vein deposits.

== Occurrence ==
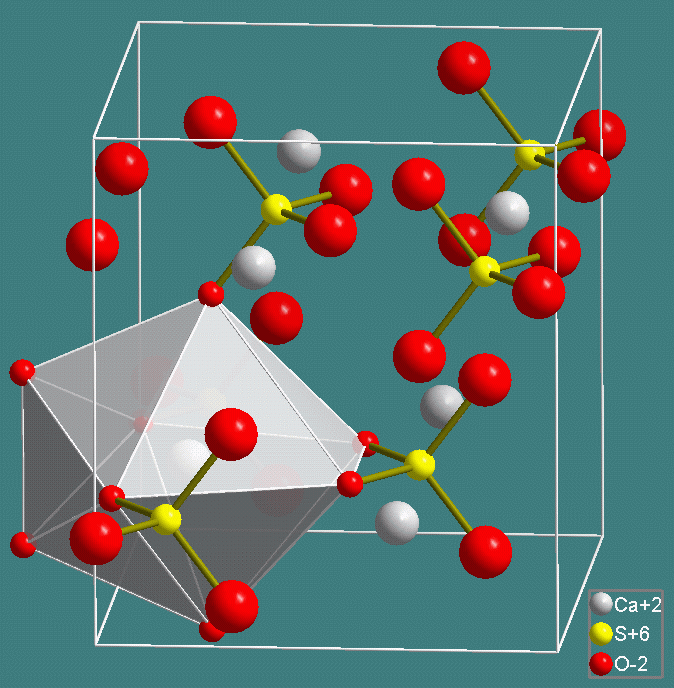
Crystal structure of anhydrite

Anhydrite is most frequently found in evaporite deposits with gypsum; it was, for instance, first discovered in 1794 in a salt mine near Hall in Tirol. In this occurrence, depth is critical since nearer the surface anhydrite has been altered to gypsum by absorption of circulating ground water.

From an aqueous solution, calcium sulfate is deposited as crystals of gypsum, but when the solution contains an excess of sodium or potassium chloride, anhydrite is deposited if the temperature is above 40 °C (104 °F). This is one method by which the mineral has been prepared artificially and is identical with its mode of origin in nature. The mineral is common in salt basins.

=== Tidal flat nodules ===
Anhydrite occurs in a tidal flat environment in the Persian Gulf sabkhas as massive diagenetic replacement nodules. Cross sections of these nodular masses have a netted appearance and have been referred to as chicken-wire anhydrite. Nodular anhydrite occurs as replacement of gypsum in a variety of sedimentary depositional environments.

=== Salt dome cap rocks ===
Massive amounts of anhydrite occur when salt domes form a caprock. Anhydrite is 1–3% of the minerals in salt domes and is generally left as a cap at the top of the salt when the halite is removed by pore waters. The typical cap rock is a salt, topped by a layer of anhydrite, topped by patches of gypsum, topped by a layer of calcite. Interaction of anhydrite with hydrocarbons at high temperature in oil fields can reduce sulfate (SO^{2–}_{4}) into hydrogen sulfide (H_{2}S) with a concomitant precipitation of calcite. The process is known as thermochemical sulfate reduction (TSR).

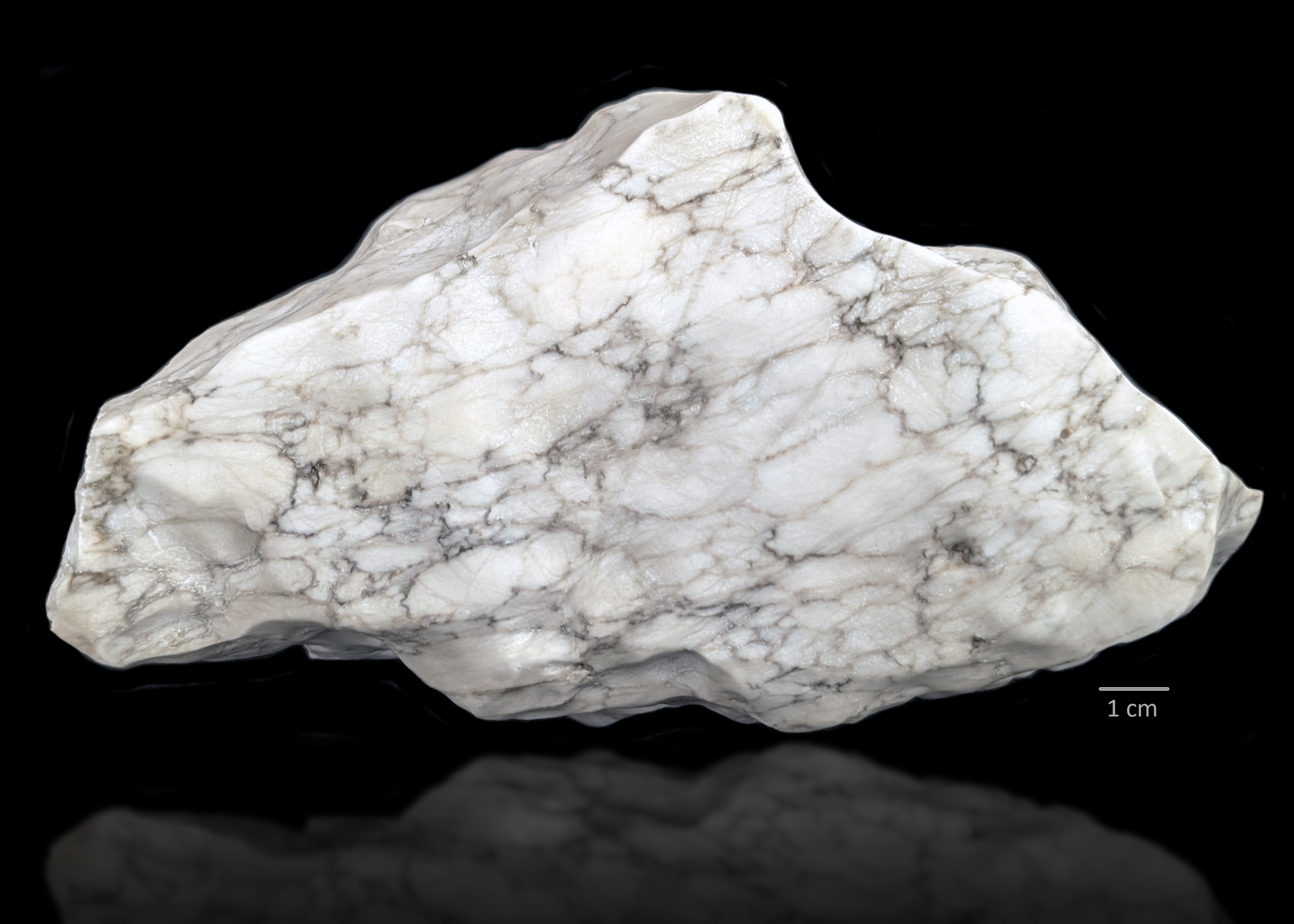
Hand sample of gypsum and anhydrite from diapir caprock showing "chicken wire" texture.

=== Igneous rocks ===
Anhydrite has been found in some igneous rocks, for example in the intrusive dioritic pluton of El Teniente, Chile and in trachyandesite pumice erupted by El Chichón volcano, Mexico.

== Naming history ==
The name anhydrite was given by A. G. Werner in 1804, because of the absence of water of crystallization, as contrasted with the presence of water in gypsum. Some obsolete names for the species are muriacite and karstenite; the former, an earlier name, being given under the impression that the substance was a chloride (muriate). A peculiar variety occurring as contorted concretionary masses is known as tripe-stone, and a scaly granular variety, from Volpino, near Bergamo, in Lombardy, as vulpinite; the latter is cut and polished for ornamental purposes.

A semi-transparent light blue-grey variety from Peru is referred to by the trade name angelite.

== Other uses ==
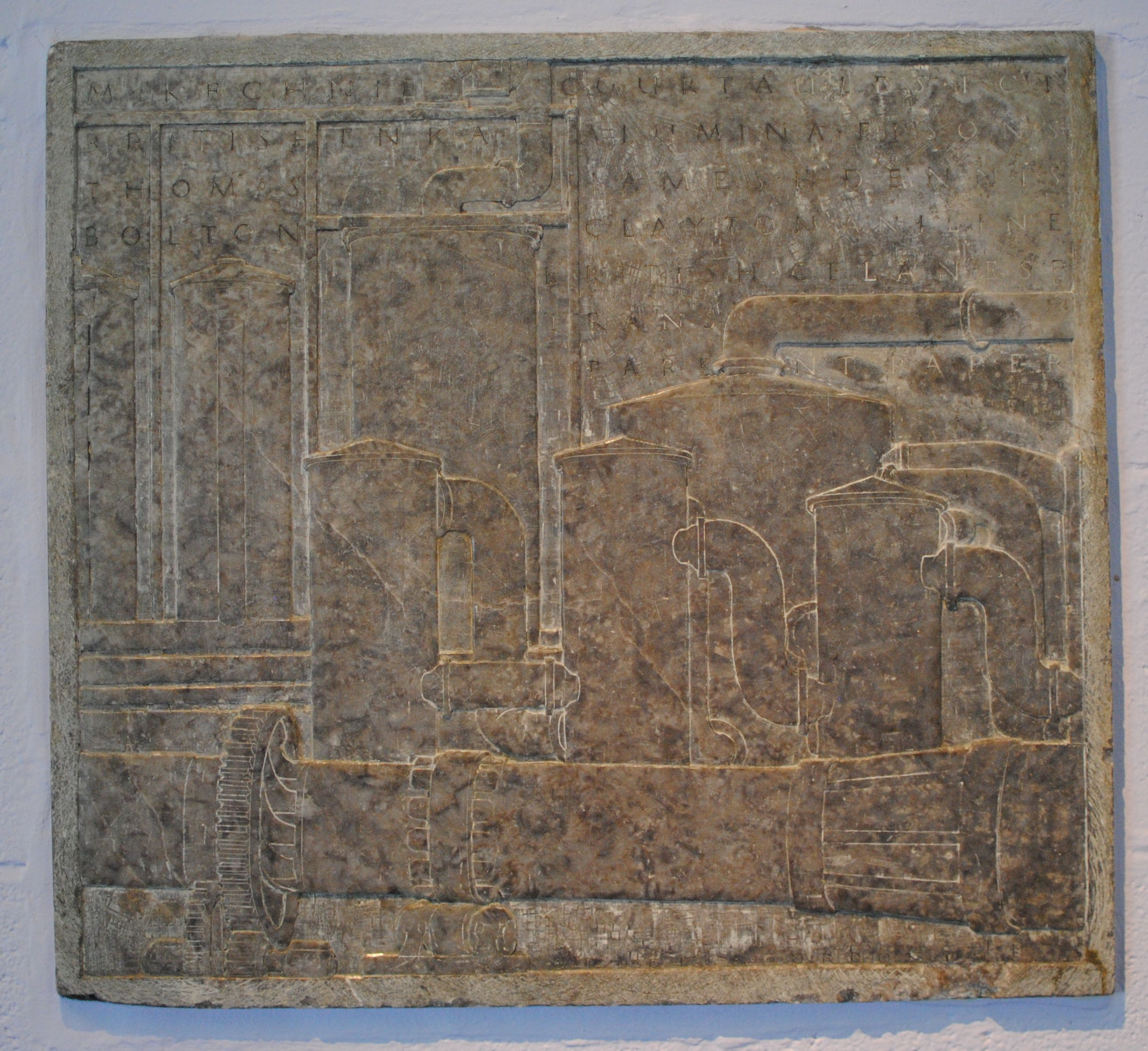
Relief carving of an anhydrite kiln, made from a piece of anhydrite, by Ophelia Gordon Bell

The Catalyst Science Discovery Centre in Widnes, England, has a relief carving of an anhydrite kiln, made from a piece of anhydrite, for the United Sulphuric Acid Corporation.

Extensive structural damage in the German city of Staufen im Breisgau has occurred since a 2007 geothermal drilling project allowed subsurface water to invade a layer of anhydrite below the city, causing extensive but uneven ground swelling as pockets of the anhydrite converted to gypsum.
