= Geology of the Dallas–Fort Worth Metroplex =

The Dallas–Fort Worth Metroplex sits above Cretaceous-age strata ranging from ≈145-66 Ma (million years ago). These Cretaceous-aged sediments lie above the eroded Ouachita Mountains and the Fort Worth Basin, which was formed by the Ouachita Orogeny. Going from west to east in the DFW Metroplex and down towards the Gulf of Mexico, the strata get progressively younger. The Cretaceous sediments dip very gently (about 1°) to the east.

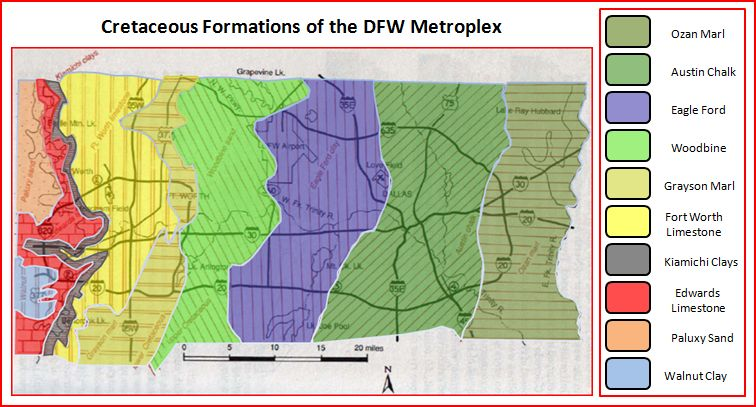
Cretaceous Formations of the Dallas-Fort Worth Metroplex

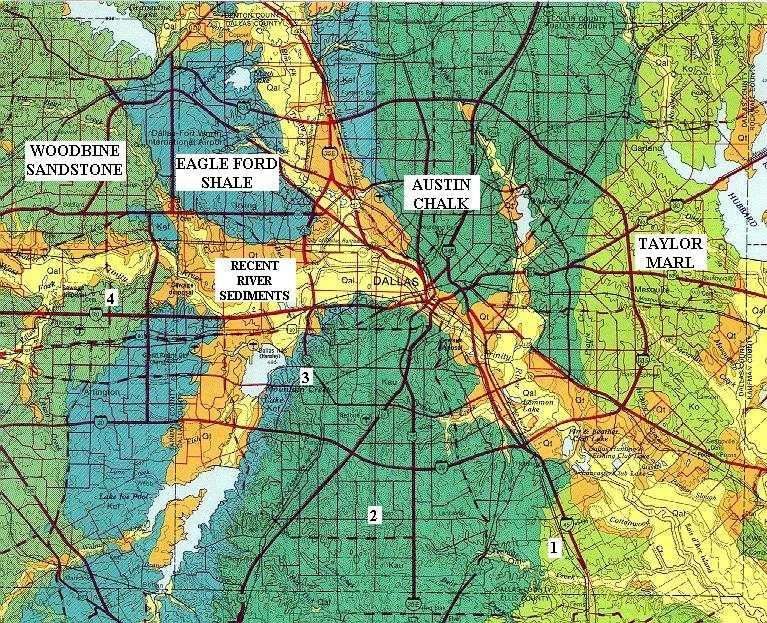
Geologic map and the labeled geologic formations that lie directly beneath the surface in Dallas County

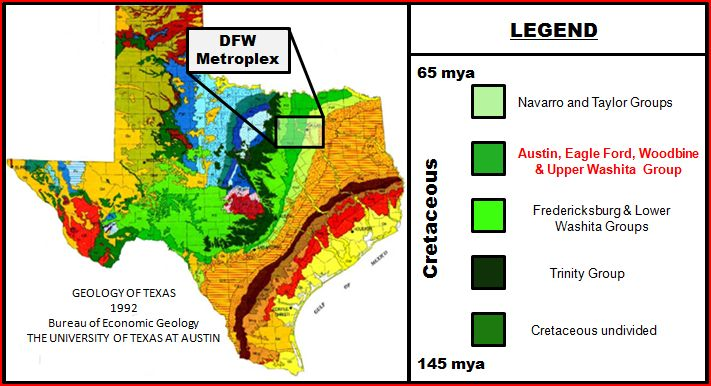
Cretaceous formations of Texas

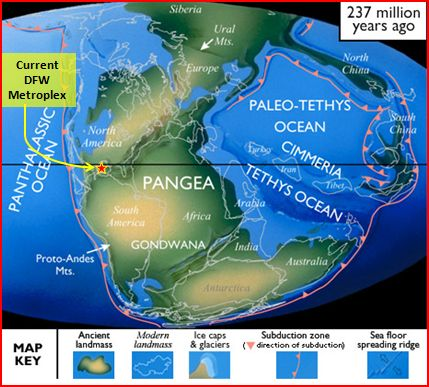
Where the DFW Metroplex was located during the last super continent known as Pangea

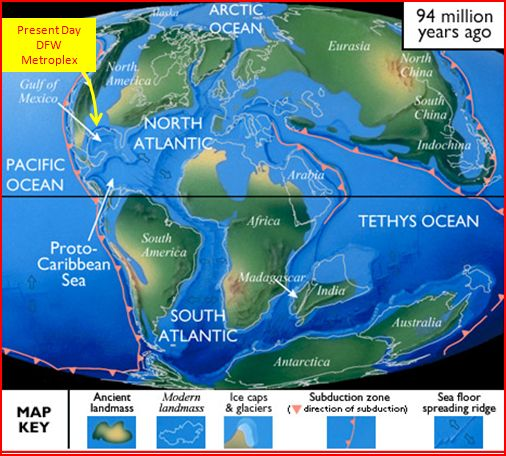
Placement of Tectonic Plates and DFW location around ≈94 million years ago

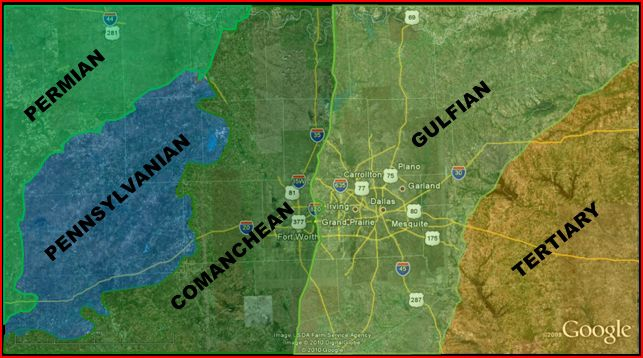
The Cretaceous rocks in the DFW Metroplex are divided into the older Comanchean Series in the west, and the younger Gulfian Series in the east, as is displayed here

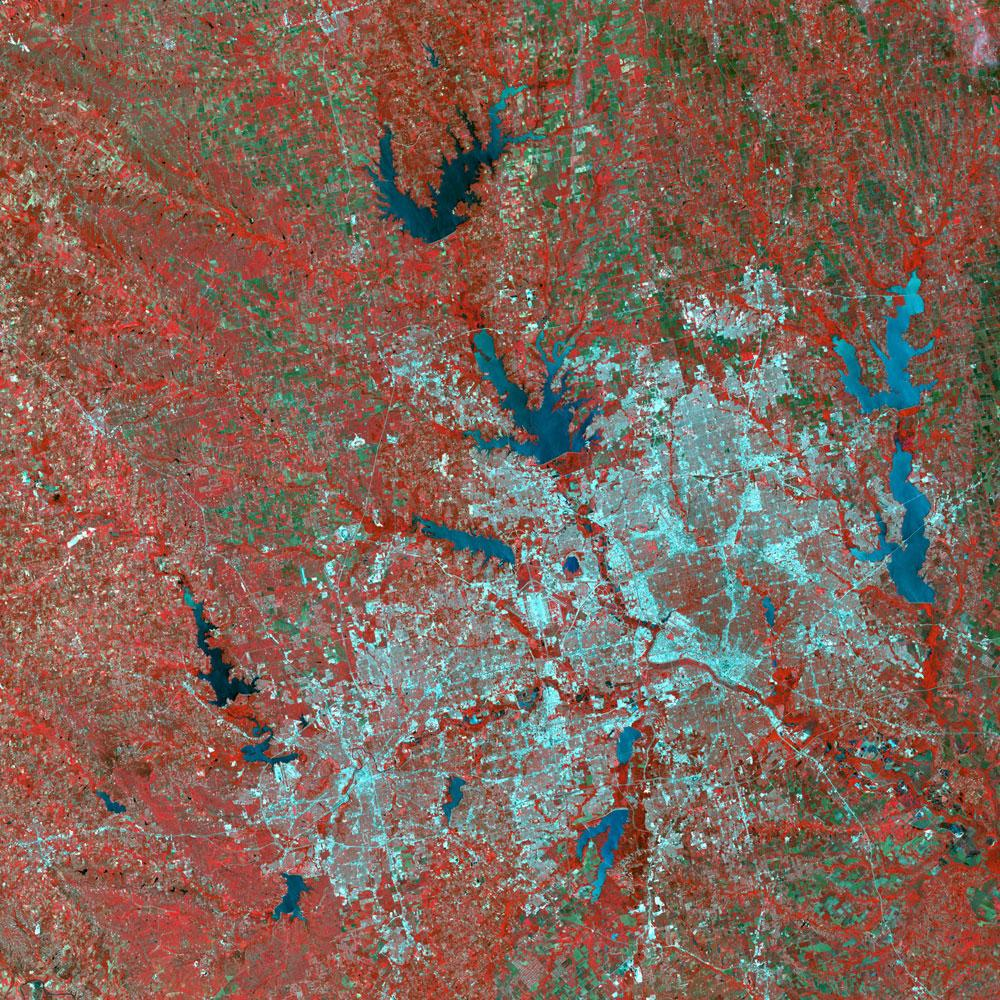
A simulated-color satellite image of Dallas and Fort Worth, Texas, taken by NASA's Landsat 7 satellite. Dallas makes up much of the right half of the urbanized area. Red is vegetated area surrounding DFW. Notice also the many reservoirs in the area.

Schematic E-W section showing the geology beneath the DFW Metroplex

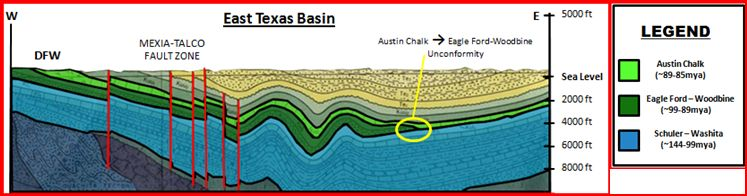
X-Section of the East Texas Basin and display of the middle Cretaceous unconformity that is responsible for the sealing of the well known East Texas petroleum reservoir of the Woodbine formation

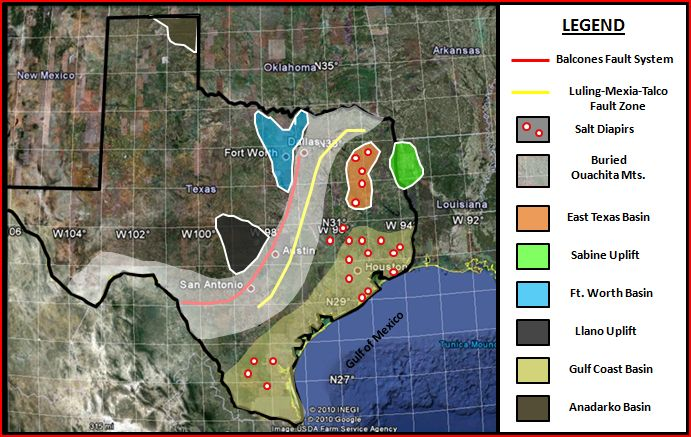
Structural features located within East and Central Texas

== Structural and tectonic history of the DFW Metroplex ==
The geology of the DFW Metroplex consists of gently tilted sediments of mostly Cretaceous age, which also obscures a much older geologic record. Sediments older than Cretaceous can only be found at the surface in the extreme western part of the DFW Metroplex, in the area around Weatherford, Texas. Ancient folded mountains formed by the Ouachita orogeny existed in the eastern part of the Metroplex 300 million years ago. These ancient mountains were reduced by erosion and rifting associated with the opening of the Gulf of Mexico in the Jurassic and then were buried beneath younger Cretaceous sediments. Although the Ouachita Mountain roots are not visible in the DFW Metroplex since they are buried, they can still be recognized through boreholes and other data. In west Texas near Marathon, the mountain range appears on the surface, and is known as the Marathon Uplift. To the north of the DFW Metroplex, the roots of the mountains can be identified in SE Oklahoma as the Arbuckle mountains, heavily eroded from the original vast mountain range.

The Marathon-Ouachita-Appalachian-Variscan cordillera, which stretched through central Texas, around Arkansas, up through the Appalachian Mountains and eventually into eastern Europe, occurred when the supercontinents Pangea and Laurussia collided to form Pangea in the late Paleozoic ≈300 Ma. The zone of deformation known as the Ouachitas marks a zone of weakness that was exploited when the Gulf of Mexico opened about 165 Ma, in Jurassic time.

The oldest rocks in Texas date from the Precambrian, specifically the Mesoproterozoic and are about 1,600 million years old, and mark the southern limit of the North American craton. These rocks are mostly buried beneath Phanerozoic sediments, but are exposed in the Llano area, where previous Precambrian igneous and metamorphic rocks were uplifted and exposed at the surface.

The Fort Worth Basin which lies beneath Cretaceous sediments west of Dallas formed as a foreland basin during the Ouachita orogeny. Horizontal shortening caused flexural isostasy to bend the lithosphere. The bent lithosphere to the west of the Ouachita mountains caused a bowl-shaped depression to form, known as a foreland basin, preserving the Mississippian sediments of the Barnett Shale and other Paleozoic sediments; these sediments mostly formed before the Pangeic collision. Significant deposits of hydrocarbons such as natural gas have economic importance as is seen in formations like the Barnett Shale.

Pangea started to break up during the Triassic ≈225Ma. Rifting affected regions which became the central Atlantic (between North America and Africa) and the Gulf of Mexico at about the same time. This rifting created a divergent plate margin that would play an integral role of the future geologic processes to follow. Rifting, which involves the stretching of pre-existing crust and mantle lithosphere, was initiated by the existence of sufficient horizontal deviatoric tensional stress that broke the lithosphere. Eventually rifting gave way to sea floor spreading in the Atlantic and Gulf of Mexico in the mid Jurassic, around ≈165 Ma. Sea floor spreading is where new oceanic lithosphere is being created by upwelling of material, unlike rifting where it only involved the stretching of the crust. Convection currents in the sub-lithospheric mantle are the driving mechanisms that caused sea floor spreading to occur. New lithosphere is made when hot material beneath ocean ridges is brought to the surface by these cells. As the new lithosphere moved horizontally away from the ridges, the new crust added to the Gulf of Mexico and the Atlantic caused the continents of North America and South America to move apart. Seafloor spreading in the Gulf of Mexico ceased by the beginning of the Cretaceous and spreading shifted to the proto-Caribbean.

Around 110-85 Ma, there was worldwide oscillatory increases in ocean floor spreading rates. The increase in the amount of basalt being injected into the ocean caused a displacement of water from the ocean basins, which resulted in sea level rise, flooding the coasts of the Texas margin and other bordering continents around the world. The major sea level rise that took place due to an occurrence of an oscillation is known as the Cenomanian transgression, which is the most well known and last major transgression in the Cretaceous. The dispersal of extra magma warmed the water in the ocean, and was a conducive environment for calcareous-shelled organisms, which after death sank to the bottom of the ocean floor creating thick deposits of limestone. In addition to the displacement of water, an increase in injected magma raised carbon dioxide levels to around 2-6 times the current level. This increase along with the extra production of crust caused global temperatures to rise, which also played an integral role in the future development of different Cretaceous formations. When the sea floor spreading rates slowed around ≈85 Ma, so did the amount of basaltic material being thrown into the ocean which caused the initial water displacement. As seen around the DFW Metroplex, the Cretaceous rocks deposited during this time were directly influenced by increased sea floor spreading rates.

== Depositional environment for the rocks of the DFW Metroplex ==
The DFW Metroplex sprawls across a 100 kilometers (62 mi) wide N-S trending belt of outcropping Cretaceous sediments. Fort Worth in the west is neatly built on Early Cretaceous (Comanche Series) and Dallas in the east is built on Late Cretaceous (Gulf Series) sediments. The Cretaceous rocks of the Comanche Series were deposited over a 20 million year interval. The sediments deposited during these 20 million years are bound within a sequence boundary, and are defined by a major regression at the end. The time frame of the Comanche Series span between ≈118-98mya, and are responsible for the deposition of the Trinity, Fredsrickberg, and Washita Groups. These three Groups all lie west of the Balcones Fault Zone, and span from slightly west of Weatherford to the east side of Fort Worth. The Trinity Group is best known for the Glen Rose Formation that lies within it. The 40–200 ft thick beds of the Glen Rose formation are composed of a limestone with alternating units consisting of clay, marl, and sand. The depositional environment of the Glen Rose was a shallow marine to shoreline environment. This shoreline environment would eventually bring notoriety to the Glen Rose since it would eventually preserve dinosaur tracks. This process would occur when living terrestrial creatures would roam about and look for food near the shoreline. As they would do this, they would leave footprints and trackways that would eventually be preserved by mud depositing in and on top of the footprints. Eventually more formations would be deposited on top of the mud layers, and build essentially a 100 million year time capsule of the trace fossil. As time passed, weathering from water and wind caused the overlying sediments to erode and expose the footprints, and hence the reason why dinosaur tracks are present in the Glen Rose Dinosaur Valley State Park.

Cretaceous formations that lie from eastern Fort Worth to east of Dallas are part of the Gulfian Series. Easterly progration of the formations go from west to east which also slowly get younger in age, ranging from ≈97Ma to 66 Ma. The Gulfian Series is known for the Cenomanian-Turonian transgression which deposited the mid-Cretaceous formations in the DFW Metroplex. The Gulfian Series consists of three groups, from oldest to youngest being the Dakota, Colorado and Montana. First of the Gulfian Series is the Woodbine formation which lies in the Dakota Group, and formed in a high energy depositional environment since it is composed mostly of large rounded grain quartz sediments. Present in the Woodbine Formation is marine and terrestrial sediments and fossils, including the last known dinosaurs in this part of Texas, dating back around ≈96mya. The Woodbine ranges in thickness of 175–250 ft, and thickens northward. Terrigenous sediments that eroded from Paleozoic rocks, and weakly metamorphosed sedimentary rocks from the Ouachita Mountains in Oklahoma constitute a large part of the Woodbine.

Transgression continued to occur after the deposition of the Woodbine, and created the Colorado Group which first created the Eagle Ford Shale which lies directly beneath west Dallas. The Eagle Ford Shale had sea level depths of around ≈100m or 330 ft, and occurred around 20–50 km from the shore. The depositional environment in the lower beds was low-energy and a slightly anoxic setting. This anoxic setting of the deeper waters in the ocean is a result several factors including increased global CO_{2} levels, higher sea levels, increased organic productivity and decay, Milankovitch cyclicity, and restricted thermohaline currents in the Western Interior Seaway. The lower section of the Eagle Ford consists of organic-rich, pyritic, and fossiliferous marine shale's which marks the maximum flooding surface, or peak of deepest water in its deposition. The different fauna that was present in the Eagle Ford suggests the waters were calm and within the photic zone. A small member of the Eagle Ford that consists of a thin limestone unit between shales is known as the Kamp Ranch. A small regressive highstand occurred to have formed this carbonate layer towards the top of the Eagle Ford, which is known due to the high energy traits it displays such as ripple marks from storm generated waves and interbedded carbonaceous siltstones. The overall thickness of the Eagle Ford Group undivided is around 200–300 feet thick.

Sea level rose even higher in this massive transgressive event, which helped form the 300–500 ft thick Austin Chalk, around ≈89-85mya. The Austin formation consists of recrystallized, fossiliferous, interbedded chalks and marls. Exposures of Austin chalk are mainly seen in quarries, roadcuts, and stream beds where the water eroded the top soil. Austin chalk is the well known white rock that the city of Dallas sits on. Volcanic ashes are present in the Austin chalk, and were deposited by wind from distant erupting volcanoes and erupting igneous intrusions around 86 Ma. These eruptions occurred along a 250 mile long by 50 mile wide belt of submarine volcanoes, which are located in present-day south-central Texas. This belt of volcanoes coincides with the trend of the Balcones Fault zone and is known as the Balcones volcanic province. Of what consisted of these ancient volcanoes is only visible in a few places since most were buried by the Austin and Taylor Groups, and now are in the subsurface. The presence of this volcanism during deposition of the Austin Chalk is correlated with the Laramide orogeny. Sea level rose for conditions to be right for the deposition of the Austin Chalk, which also coincides with the maximum extent of the Cretaceous Interior Seaway. The depths of the deposition of the Austin Chalk occurred in ≈250m or 820 ft of water. The Austin Chalk formation is filled with micro-organisms known as coccoliths, and are a product of the warm waters that were displaced from the increased sea-floor spreading at the time.

On top of the Austin Chalk are several different layers of beds known as the Taylor formation. Deposition of the Taylor beds marks the point of eustatic regression which continued until the end of the Cretaceous period. Ozan Marl is the first bed overlying the Austin chalk and can be found underneath the city of Richardson and Garland. The Ozan Marl consists of calcareous micaceous clay with increasing silt and sand towards the top. The environment that hosted the deposition of the Ozan marl was still in a relatively deep marine and low energy environment, but began to see sedimentation dominated by mud since the sea level was falling. The Ozan marl is around 500 ft thick, and marine megafossils can be found. On top of the Ozan marl is two thin beds known as the Wolfe City Sandstone and Pecan Gap Chalk. The Wolfe City Sandstone is known in the city of Rockwall, Texas for its sandstone dikes that protrude into the surface, and gives a surface expression of a wall built of rocks. The very top of the Taylor has a 300-foot section of marls known as the Marlbrook Marl.

The last beds of the Cretaceous, which are also deposited directly over the Taylor formation and found east of Dallas are the Navarro beds. Navarro beds reflect anoxic waters at the time due to the shale present, and are a result of increased volcanic activity in the south-western part of the United States. During the end of deposition of the Taylor formation, the eustatic regression had brought sea-level down to the present day shoreline of the Gulf of Mexico. This worldwide regression marks the slowing of sea-floor spreading and bounds the Gulfian Series in a sequence boundary. In the western part of the country the Laramide Orogeny that was building the Rockies Mountains started to accommodate horizontal shortening by uplift versus the previous folding and thrusting accommodation. Also during this time around 66 mya a major extinction including dinosaurs took place, and is believed to have been caused by a meteorite hitting Mexico off the Yucatan Peninsula. All of these occurrences mark the end of an important time for Texas, especially the DFW Metroplex, and brought in a new Era and Period known respectively as the Cenozoic and Paleogene.

== Fossils ==
The oldest fossils in the DFW metroplex can be collected at Mineral Wells Fossil Park NW of Fort Worth. These fossils include well preserved Pennsylvanian marine fossils such as crinoids and brachiopods, which have been dated to 300 million years old.

Remnants of dinosaurs and Late Cretaceous marine reptiles such as Mosasaur are found. One species of mosasaur was named after the city: Dallasaurus turneri.

Dinosaur Valley State Park is located in Glen Rose Texas off 67 and 144 which is south west of Fort Worth. Dinosaur Valley State Park has some of the world's best preserved dinosaur tracks. The tracks were left by carnivorous theropods and herbivorous sauropods.

Woodbine Formation located between Dallas and Fort Worth consists of marine and terrestrial fossils such as concretions and trace fossils, including the last known dinosaurs in this part of Texas. Directly east of the Woodbine is the Eagle Ford, where fossilized shark teeth, plesiosaurs, crabs, and small marine lizards called Coniasaurus can be found. The northwest quadrant of the I-20 and 408 loop is abundant in shark teeth. Directly east of 408 on Kiest Blvd is a large section of the Eagle Ford Shale outcropping beneath the Austin Chalk, where fossilized shark teeth are often found. Directly beneath Dallas, ammonites are sometimes found, though these are rare. Shark teeth are present and primarily easy to find in condensed zones, along with clam shells (Inoceramus) which may also be found in the Austin Chalk. Although not viewable with the naked eye, Austin Chalk includes millions of coccoliths, or fossilized algae.

== Trinity River ==
The Trinity River has been important in shaping the DFW Metroplex. Dallas was situated at the best ford, downstream from where the Elm Fork joins the main stream, where the river flows southeast over the chalk. This provided a place where travelers need only cross the river once, at a place with relatively firm landings and bottoms. This was the best place to cross the Trinity from the earliest days, best for fordings, ferries, and bridges. During the days of the Republic of Texas, the DFW Metroplex was mostly uninhabited by Europeans, but settlers began to find their way north in the 1840s. The route north naturally followed the low hills and gentle ridges of Austin chalk hills to the river ford that soon became Dallas. The future site of Dallas was selected by John Neely Bryan as the place for his trading post to overlook the ferry that he operated at the crossing.

Dallas was also affected subtly by much younger geologic formations deposited by an older, more vigorous Trinity River. The northern hemisphere Ice age occurred in Pleistocene time, when a continental ice sheet reached as far south as Kansas during the Pre-Illinoian Stage. The Pleistocene terraces affected the development of Dallas, providing a rich alluvial soil and a perched aquifer, very useful indeed during the early years. Downtown Dallas is built on a series of these terraces, rising subtly eastward from the Trinity river.

=== Water quality ===
The DFW Metroplex had an additional, if subtle, geologic advantage. The Trinity is not good for navigation by boats but is great for drinking. Trinity River water is better than either of the larger rivers to the north and south, the Red River and the Brazos River. The larger rivers are longer and flow over salt-bearing Permian sediments, well west of the Trinity headwaters. The Trinity is consequently sweeter water than either the larger Brazos or Red rivers. Life is better and easier near sweet water, and this simple fact helped DFW prosper relative to settlements on the larger rivers to the north and south. Because the Trinity is not suitable for navigation, the Metroplex could not have grown to be a large city until the railroad arrived, which happened early in the Metroplex's history, in the early 1870s. (See: History of Dallas, Texas (1874–1929)) The Dallas-Fort Worth Metroplex is thus truly a modern metropolitan area, because it could not have grown so large until mechanical transportation systems made the Trinity disadvantage in river navigation insignificant.
