= Shale gas in the United States =

US shale gas basins, 2011

Shale gas in the United States is an available source of unconventional natural gas. Led by new applications of hydraulic fracturing technology and horizontal drilling, development of new sources of shale gas has offset declines in production from conventional gas reservoirs, and has led to major increases in reserves of U.S. natural gas. Largely due to shale gas discoveries, estimated reserves of natural gas in the United States in 2008 were 35% higher than in 2006.

In 2007, shale gas fields included the #2 (Barnett/Newark East) and #13 (Antrim) sources of natural gas in the United States in terms of gas volumes produced. The number of unconventional natural gas wells in the U.S. rose from 18,485 in 2004 to 25,145 in 2007 and is expected to continue increasing until about 2040.

The economic success of shale gas in the United States and rapid growth in the amount produced after 2009 has led to rapid development of shale gas in Canada, and, more recently, has spurred interest in shale gas possibilities in Europe, Asia, and Australia. It has been postulated that there may be a 100-year supply of natural gas in the United States, but only 11 years of gas supply is in the form of proven reserves.

== Shale gas production ==
Shale gas production by geologic formation

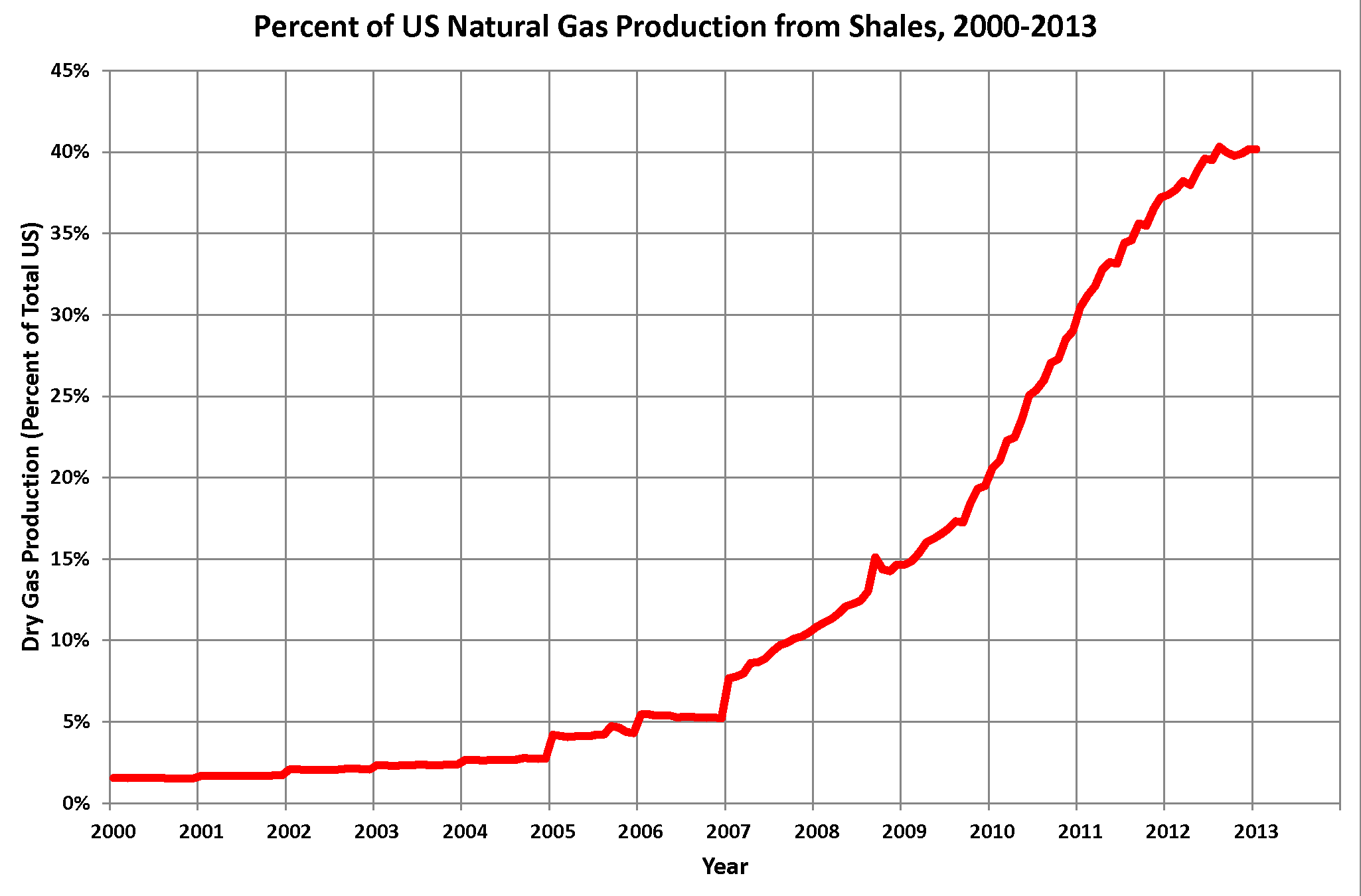
Percent of total U.S. gas production from shale, 2000–2013 (US EIA)

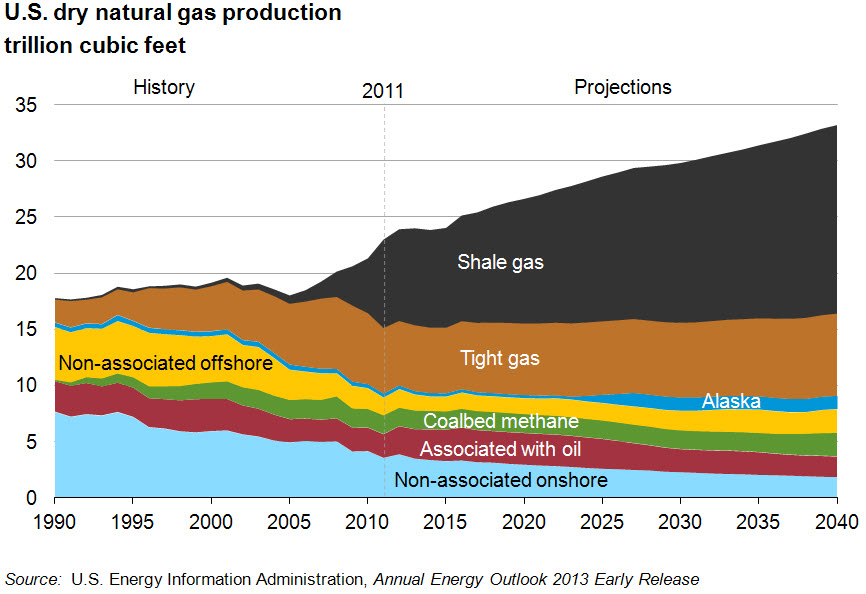
Shale gas production has grown rapidly in recent years, and is projected by the Energy Information Administration to increase further.

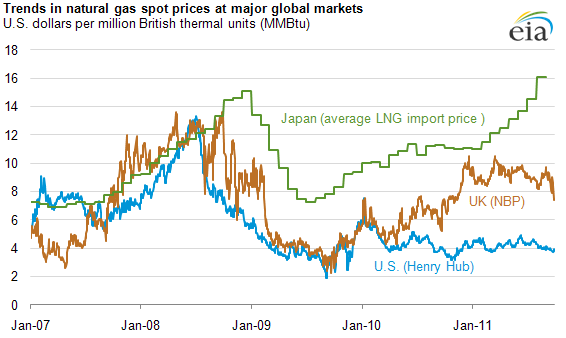
Comparison of natural gas prices in Japan, United Kingdom, and United States, 2007–2011

U.S. shale gas production grew rapidly after a long-term effort by the natural gas industry in partnership with the United States Department of Energy to improve drilling and extraction methods while increasing exploration efforts. U.S. shale production was 2.02 trillion cubic feet (57 billion cubic metres) in 2008, an increase of 71% over the previous year. In 2009, US shale gas production grew 54% to 3.11 trillion cubic feet (88 billion cubic metres), while remaining proven US shale reserves at year-end 2009 increased 76% to 60.6 trillion cubic feet (1.72 trillion cubic metres).

In its Annual Energy Outlook for 2011, the US Energy Information Administration (EIA) more than doubled its estimate of technically recoverable shale gas reserves in the US, to 827 trillion cubic feet (23.4 trillion cubic metres) from 353 trillion cubic feet (10.0 trillion cubic metres), by including data from drilling results in new shale fields, such as the Marcellus, Haynesville, and Eagle Ford shales. In 2012 the EIA lowered its estimates again to 482 tcf. Shale production is projected to increase from 23% of total US gas production in 2010 to 49% by 2035.

The development of shale gas is expected to significantly increase U.S. energy security and help reduce greenhouse gas pollution.

— White House, Office of the Press Secretary, 17 November 2009

The availability of large shale gas reserves in the US has led some to propose natural gas-fired power plants as lower-carbon emission replacements for coal plants, and as backup power sources for wind energy.

In June 2011, The New York Times questioned the impartiality of some of the reports issued by the agency with optimistic projections of the reserves, noting that people involved in the preparation of the reports had investments in the petroleum industry.

The article was criticized by, among others, The New York Times' own public editor for lack of balance, in omitting facts and viewpoints favorable to shale gas production and economics. Other critics of the article included bloggers at Forbes and the Council on Foreign Relations. Also in 2011, Diane Rehm had Ian Urbina; Seamus McGraw, writer and author of The End of Country; Tony Ingraffea, a professor of engineering at Cornell; and John Hanger, former secretary of Pennsylvania Department of Environmental Protection; on a radio call-in show about Urbino's articles and the broader subject. The associations representing the natural gas industry, such as America's Natural Gas Alliance, were invited to be on the program but declined.

In June 2011, when Urbina's article appeared in The New York Times, the latest figures for U.S. proved reserves of shale gas were 97.4 trillion cubic feet, as of the end of 2010. Over the next three years 2011 through 2013, shale gas production totaled 28.3 trillion cubic feet, about 29% of the end-of-2010 proved reserves. Contrary to concerns of overstated reserves quoted in his article, both shale gas production and shale gas proved reserves have increased. US shale gas production in June 2011 was 21.6 billion cubic feet per day of dry gas.

Since then, shale gas production has increased, and by March 2015 was 41.1 billion cubic feet per day, almost double the June 2011 rate, and provided 55% of total US dry natural gas production. Despite the rapidly increasing production, companies replaced their proved reserves much faster than production, so that by the end of 2013, companies reported that shale gas proved reserves still in the ground had grown to 159.1 TCF, an increase of 63% over the end of 2010 reserves.

Advances in technology or experience can lead to greater productivity. Drilling for shale gas and light tight oil in the United States became much more efficient from 2007 to 2014. Bakken wells drilled in January 2014 produced 2.4 times as much oil as those drilled five years earlier. In the Marcellus Gas Trend, wells drilled in January 2014 produced more than nine times as much gas per day of drilling rig time as those drilled five years previously, in January 2009.

== History ==
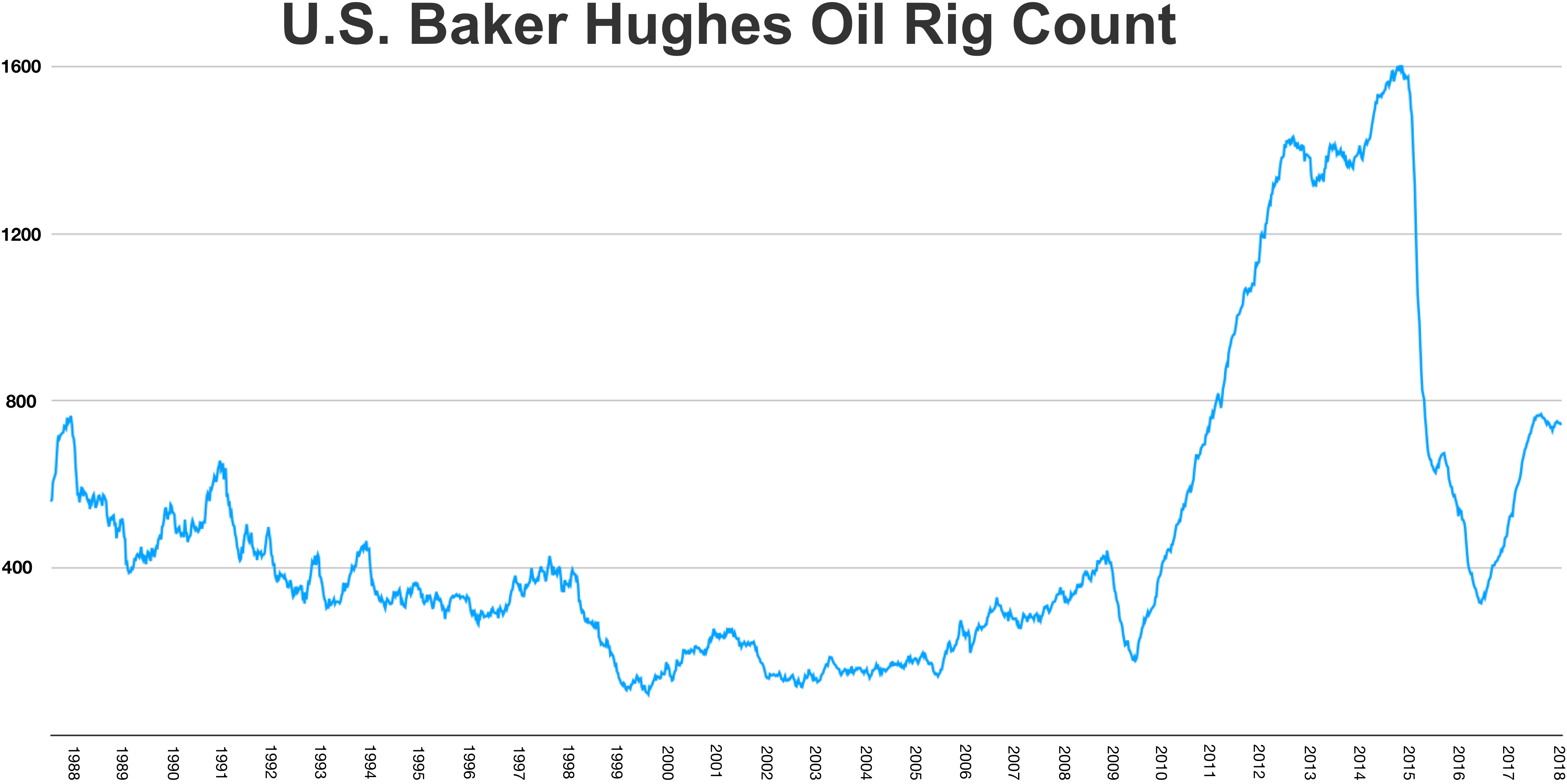
U.S. Baker Hughes oil rig count

Shale gas was first extracted as a resource in Fredonia, New York, in 1825, in shallow, low-pressure fractures.

The Big Sandy gas field, in naturally fractured Devonian shales, started development in 1915, in Floyd County, Kentucky. By 1976, the field sprawled over thousands of square miles of eastern Kentucky and into southern West Virginia, with five thousand wells in Kentucky alone, producing from the Ohio Shale and the Cleveland Shale, together known locally as the "Brown Shale." Since at least the 1940s, the shale wells had been stimulated by detonating explosives down the hole. In 1965 some operators started hydraulic fracturing the wells, using relatively small fracs: 50,000 pounds of sand and 42,000 gallons of water; the frac jobs generally increased production, especially from lower-yielding wells. The field had an expected ultimate recovery of two trillion cubic feet of gas, but the average per-well recovery was small, and largely depended on the presence of natural fractures.

Other commercial gas production from Devonian-age shales became widespread in the Appalachian, Michigan, and Illinois basins in the 1920s, but production was usually small.

U.S. shale natural gas production rapidly increased after 2008—termed the "shale gas revolution" or "fracking revolution" by energy scholars—leading to a reversal of decades where US natural gas production was falling. During the 2010s and early 2020s, the United States produced so much more natural gas that it moved to being a net exporter.

=== Federal government impact ===
Federal government policy have had mixed effects on the production of natural gas. Some policies have disincented market-based innovation, while federal research and development expenditures have also advanced gas production techniques and supply alternatives.

Federal price controls on natural gas led to shortages in the 1970s.

Faced with declining natural gas production, the federal government invested in supply alternatives, including the Eastern Gas Shales Project, which lasted from 1976 to 1992, and the annual FERC-approved research budget of the Gas Research Institute, which was funded by a tax on natural gas shipments from 1976 to 2000. The Department of Energy partnered with private gas companies to complete the first successful air-drilled multi-fracture horizontal well in shale in 1986. Microseismic imaging, an important input to both hydraulic fracturing in shale and offshore oil drilling, originated from coalbed research at Sandia National Laboratories.

The Eastern Gas Shales Project concentrated on extending and improving recoveries in known productive shale gas areas, particularly the greater Big Sandy Gas Field of Kentucky and West Virginia. The program applied two technologies that had been developed previously by industry, massive hydraulic fracturing and horizontal drilling, to shale gas formations. In 1976, two engineers for the federally-funded Morgantown Energy Research Center (MERC) patented an early technique for directional drilling in shale.

The federal government also provided tax credits and rules benefiting the industry in the 1980 Energy Act. Gas production from Devonian shales was exempted from federal price controls, and Section 29 tax credits were given for unconventional gas, including shale gas, from 1980 to 2000.

Although the work of the Gas Research Institute and the Eastern Gas Shales Project had increased gas production in the southern Appalachian Basin and the Michigan Basin, in the late 1990s shale gas was still widely seen as marginal to uneconomic without tax credits, and shale gas provided only 1.6% of US gas production in 2000, when the federal tax credits expired. The Eastern Gas Shales Project had tested a wide range of stimulation methods, but the DOE concluded that stimulation alone could not make the eastern gas shales economic. In 1995, the United States Geological Survey noted that future production of gas from the eastern shales would depend on future improvements in technology. However, according to some analysts, the federal programs had planted the seeds of the coming shale gas boom.

In 1991, Mitchell Energy (now Devon Energy) completed the first horizontal fracture in the Texas Barnett shale, a project subsidized by the Gas Technology Institute, which was funded by a federal tax on gas pipelines. The first Barnett horizontal fracture was an economic failure, as were Mitchell's later experiments with horizontal wells. The Barnett Shale boom became highly successful with vertical wells, and it was not until 2005 that horizontal wells being drilled in the Barnett outnumbered vertical wells. Throughout the 1990s, the Gas Technology Institute partnered with Mitchell Energy in applying a number of other technologies in the Barnett Shale. The then-vice president of Mitchell Energy recalled: "You cannot diminish DOE's involvement."

=== Barnett Shale ===
Mitchell Energy began producing gas from the Barnett Shale of North Texas in 1981, but the results at first were uneconomic. The company persevered for years in experimenting with new techniques. Mitchell soon abandoned the foam fracture method that was developed by the Eastern Gas Shales Project, in favor of nitrogen gel-water fractures. Mitchell achieved the first highly economic fracture completion of the Barnett Shale in 1998, by using slick-water fracturing. According to the United States Geological Survey: "It was not until development of the Barnett Shale play in the 1990s that a technique suitable for fracturing shales was developed" Although Mitchell experimented with horizontal wells, early results were not successful, and the Barnett Shale boom became highly successful with vertical wells. 2005 was the first year that the majority of new Barnett wells drilled were horizontal; by 2008, 94% of the Barnett wells drilled were horizontal.

Since the success of the Barnett Shale, natural gas from shale has been the fastest growing contributor to total primary energy (TPE) in the United States, and has led many other countries to pursue shale deposits. According to the IEA, the economical extraction of shale gas more than doubles the projected production potential of natural gas, from 125 years to over 250 years.

In 1996, shale gas wells in the United States produced 0.3 trillion cubic feet (8.5 billion cubic metres), 1.6% of US gas production; by 2006, production had more than tripled to 1.1 trillion cubic feet (31 billion cubic metres) per year, 5.9% of US gas production. By 2005, there were 14,990 shale gas wells in the US. A record 4,185 shale gas wells were completed in the US in 2007.

In 2005, energy exploration of the Barnett Shale in Texas, resulting from new technology, inspired an economic confidence in the industry as similar operations soon followed across the Southeast, including at Arkansas's Fayetteville Shale and Louisiana's Haynesville Shale.

In January 2008, a joint study between Pennsylvania State University and State University of New York at Fredonia professors Terry Engelder, Geoscience professor at Penn State, and Gary G. Lash increased estimates as much as 250 times over the previous estimate for the Marcellus shale by the United States Geological Survey. The report circulated throughout the industry. In 2008, Engelder and Lash had noted a gas rush was occurring and there was significant leasing by Texas-based Range Resources, Anadarko Petroleum, Chesapeake Energy, and Cabot Oil & Gas.

== Shale gas by location ==
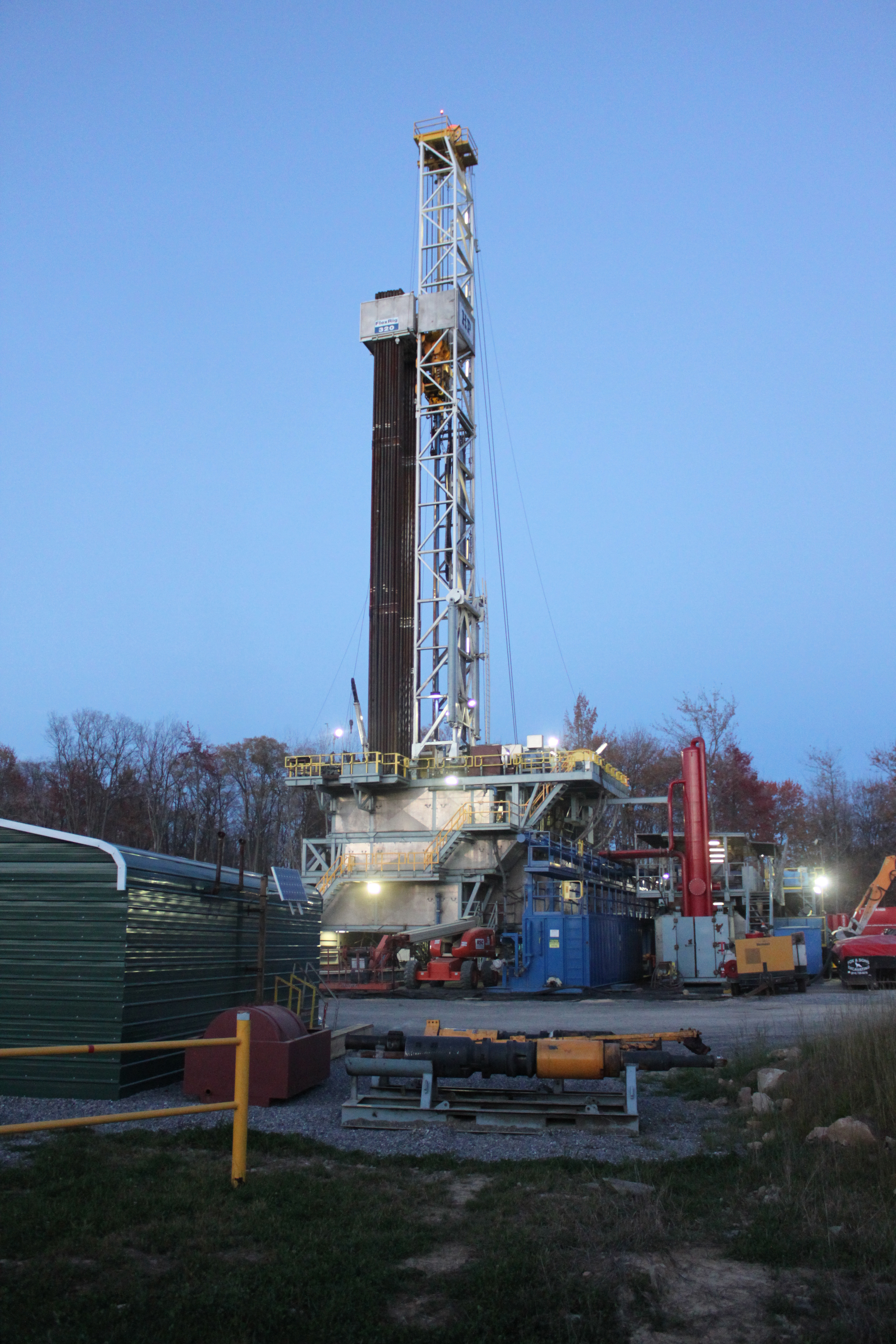
A Marcellus shale rig in Roulette, Pennsylvania

=== Antrim Shale, Michigan ===
The Antrim Shale of Upper Devonian age produces along a belt across the northern part of the Michigan Basin. Although the Antrim Shale has produced gas since the 1940s, the play was not active until the late 1980s. Unlike other shale gas plays such as the Barnett Shale, the natural gas from the Antrim appears to be biogenic gas generated by the action of bacteria on the organic-rich rock.

In 2007, the Antrim gas field produced 136 billion cubic feet (3.9 billion cubic metres) of gas, making it the 13th largest source of natural gas in the United States.

=== Barnett Shale, Texas ===
The first Barnett Shale well was completed in 1981 in Wise County. Drilling expanded greatly in the past several years due to higher natural gas prices and use of horizontal wells to increase production. In contrast to older shale gas plays, such as the Antrim Shale, the New Albany Shale, and the Ohio Shale, the Barnett Shale completions are much deeper (up to 8,000 feet). The thickness of the Barnett varies from 100 to 1,000 feet (300 m), but most economic wells are located where the shale is between 300 and 600 feet (180 m) thick. The success of the Barnett has spurred exploration of other deep shales.

In 2007, the Barnett shale (Newark East) gas field produced 1.11 trillion cubic feet (31 billion cubic metres) of gas, making it the second-largest source of natural gas in the United States. The Barnett shale currently produces more than 6% of US natural gas production.

In April 2015, Baker Hughes reported that there are no rigs in activity at the Barnett gas field. (That doesn't mean no production as there are still plenty of wells already drilled but yet to be harvested).

=== Caney Shale, Oklahoma ===
The Caney Shale in the Arkoma Basin is the stratigraphic equivalent of the Barnett Shale in the Ft. Worth Basin. The formation has become a gas producer since the large success of the Barnett play.

=== Conasauga Shale, Alabama ===
In 2008–2009, wells were drilled to produce gas from the Cambrian Conasauga shale in northern Alabama. Activity is in St. Clair, Etowah, and Cullman counties.

=== Fayetteville Shale, Arkansas ===
The Mississippian age Fayetteville Shale produces gas in the Arkansas part of the Arkoma Basin. The productive section varies in thickness from 50 to 550 feet (170 m), and in depth from 1,500 to 6,500 feet (460 to 1,980 m). The shale gas was originally produced through vertical wells, but operators are increasingly going to horizontal wells in the Fayetteville. Expand Energy is a major producer in the play.

=== Floyd Shale, Alabama ===
The Floyd Shale of Mississippian age is a current gas exploration target in the Black Warrior Basin of northern Alabama and Mississippi.

=== Gothic Shale, Colorado ===
In 1916, the United States Geographic Survey reported that Colorado alone had enough oil baring shale deposits to make 20,000 million barrels of crude oil; of which, 2,000 million barrels of gasoline then could be refined. Bill Barrett Corporation has drilled and completed several gas wells in the Gothic Shale. The wells are in Montezuma County, Colorado, in the southeast part of the Paradox basin. A horizontal well in the Gothic flowed 5,700 MCF per day.

=== Haynesville Shale, Louisiana ===
Although the Jurassic Haynesville Shale of northwest Louisiana has produced gas since 1905, it has been the focus of modern shale gas activity only since a gas discovery drilled by Cubic Energy in November 2007. The Cubic Energy discovery was followed by a March 2008 announcement by Chesapeake Energy that it had completed a Haynesville Shale gas well. Haynesville shale wells have also been drilled in northeast Texas, where it is also known as the Bossier Shale.

=== Collingwood-Utica Shale, Michigan ===
From 2008 through 2010, Encana (now Ovintiv) accumulated a "large land position" (250,000 net acres) at an "average $150/acre" in the Collingwood Utica shale gas play in Michigan's Middle Ordovician Collingwood formation. Natural gas is produced from the Collingwood shale and the overlying Utica shale.

The Michigan public land auction took place in early May 2010 in one of "America's most promising oil and gas plays".

=== New Albany Shale, Illinois Basin ===
The Devonian-Mississippian New Albany Shale produces gas in the southeast Illinois Basin in Illinois, Indiana, and Kentucky. The New Albany has been a gas producer in this area for more than 100 years, but improved well completion technology has increased drilling activity. Wells are 250 to 2,000 feet (610 m) deep. The gas is described as having a mixed biogenic and thermogenic origin.

=== Pearsall Shale, Texas ===
As of 2007, operators had completed approximately 50 wells in the Pearsall Shale in the Maverick Basin of south Texas. The most active company in the play was TXCO Resources. The gas wells had all been vertical until 2008, when TXCO drilled and completed a number of horizontal wells.

=== Devonian shales, Appalachian Basin ===
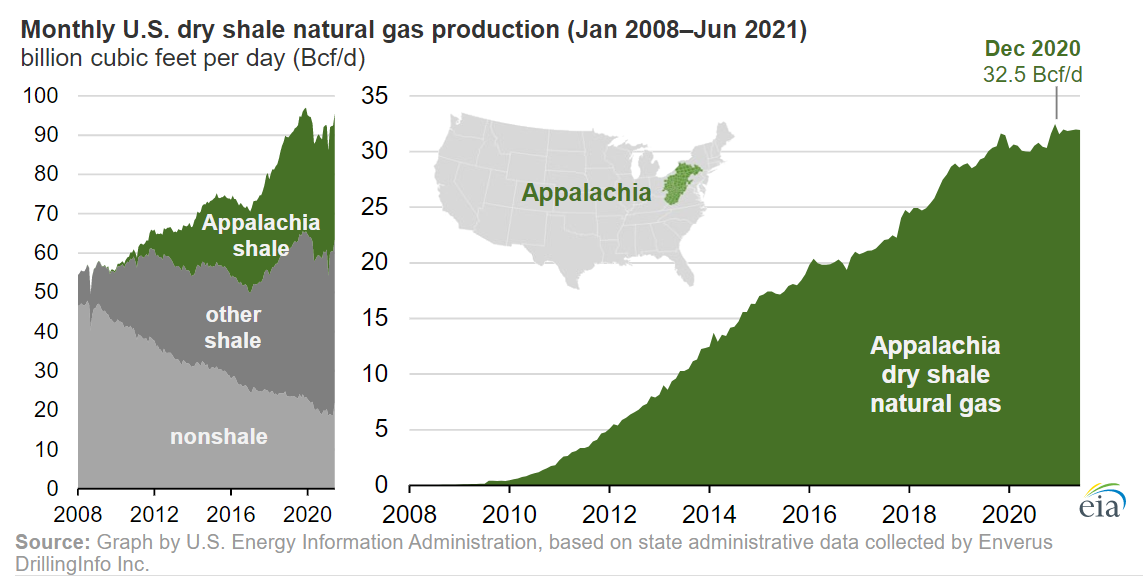
Appalachian dry shale natural gas production, 2008–2021

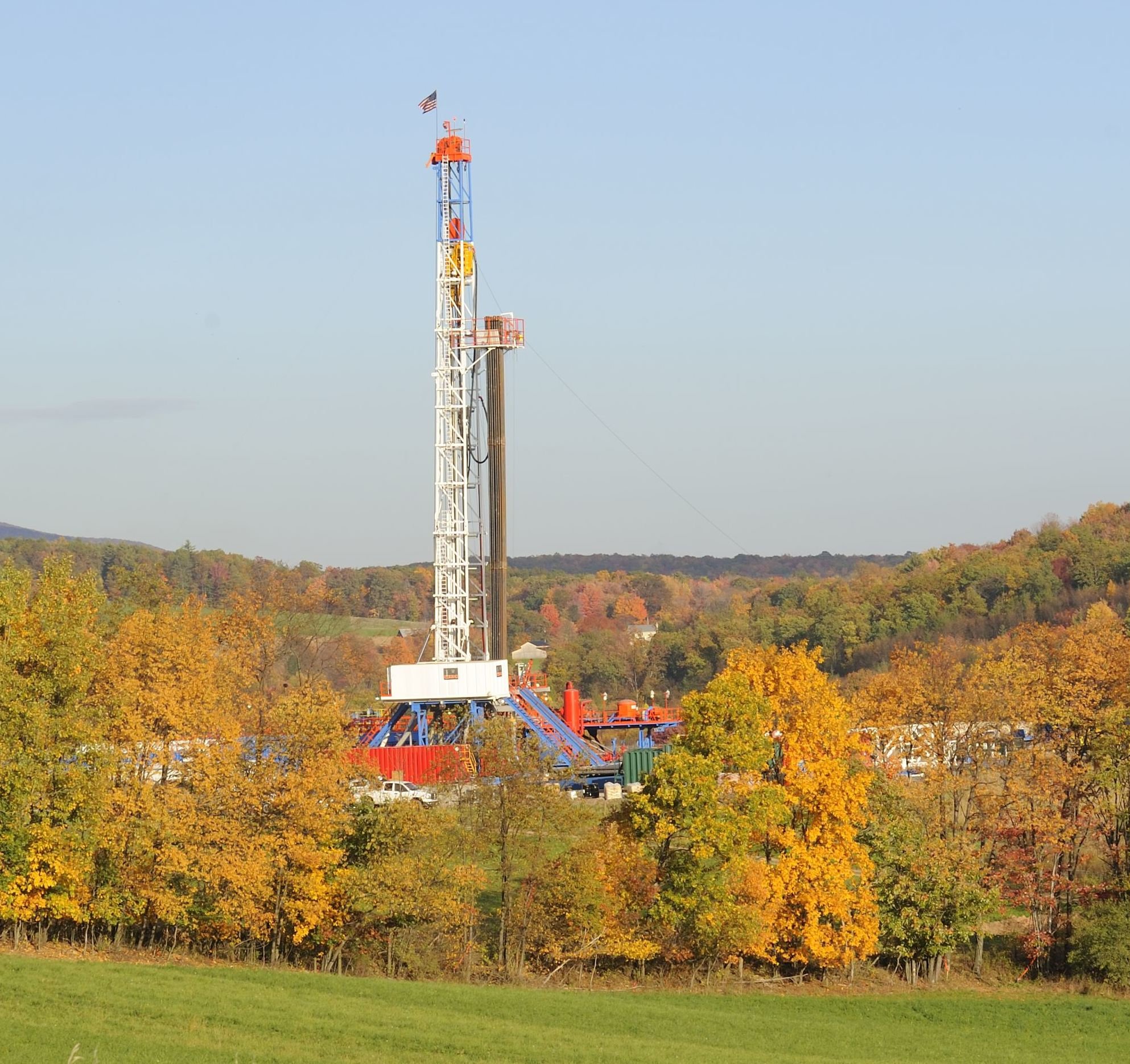
Drilling a horizontal shale gas well in Appalachia

==== Chattanooga and Ohio Shales ====
The upper Devonian shales of the Appalachian Basin, which are known by different names in different areas have produced gas since the early 20th century. The main producing area straddles the state lines of Virginia, West Virginia, and Kentucky, but extends through central Ohio and along Lake Erie into the panhandle of Pennsylvania. More than 20,000 wells produce gas from Devonian shales in the basin. The wells are commonly 3,000 to 5,000 feet (1,500 m) deep. The shale most commonly produced is the Chattanooga Shale, also called the Ohio Shale. The US Geological Survey estimated a total resource of 12.2 trillion cubic feet (350 billion cubic metres) of natural gas in Devonian black shales from Kentucky to New York.

==== Marcellus Shale ====
The Marcellus Formation in West Virginia, Pennsylvania, and New York, once thought to be played out, is estimated to hold 168-516 trillion cubic feet (14.6 trillion cubic metres) still available with horizontal drilling. It was suggested that the Marcellus shale and other Devonian shales of the Appalachian Basin, could supply the northeast U.S. with natural gas.

=== Utica Shale, New York and Ohio ===
In October 2009, Gastem, a Canadian company, which had been drilling gas wells into the Ordivician Utica Shale in Quebec, drilled the first of its three state-permitted Utica Shale wells in Otsego County, New York.

=== Woodford Shale, Oklahoma ===
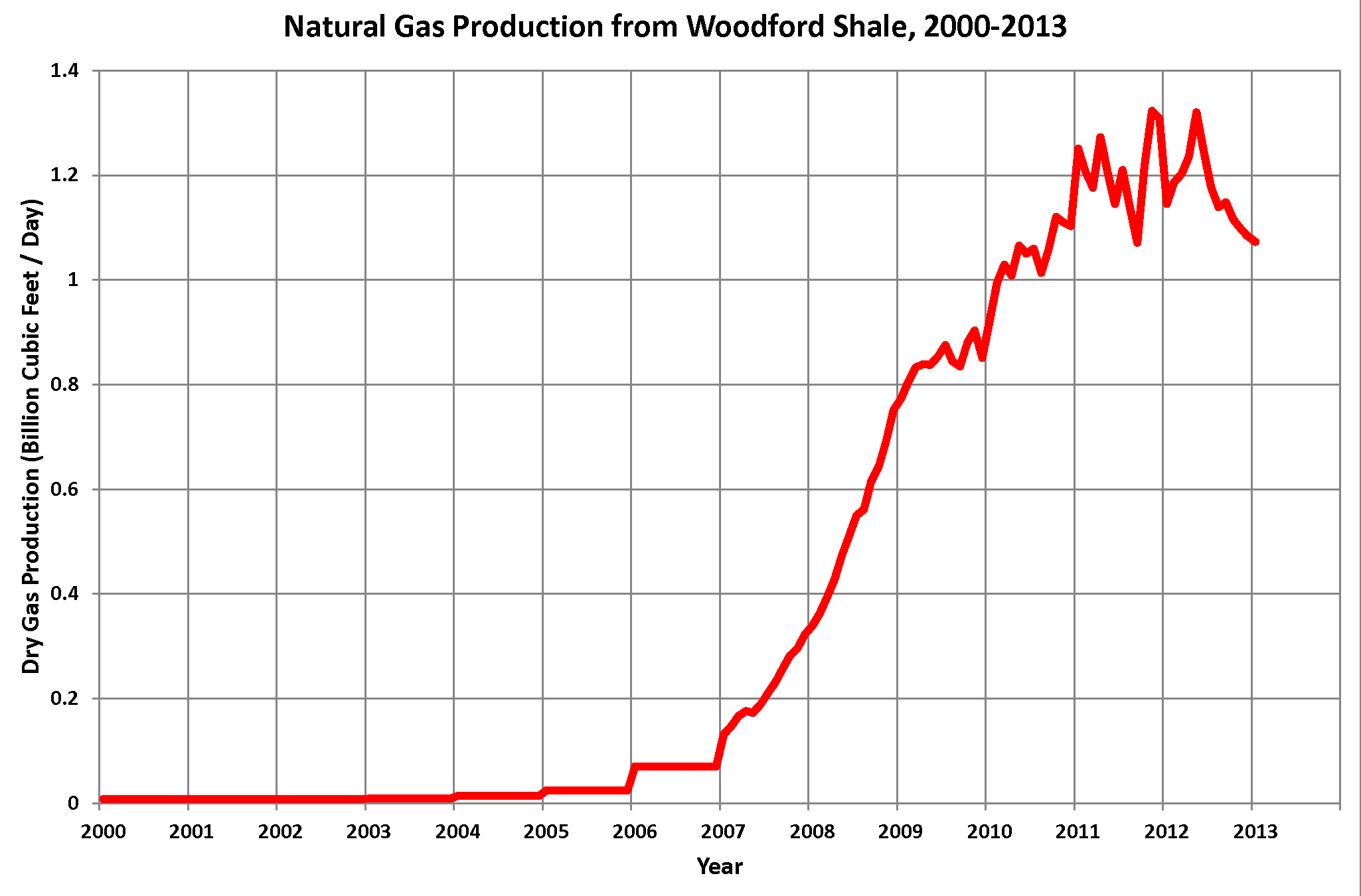
Natural gas production from the Woodford Shale

The Devonian Woodford Shale in Oklahoma is from 50 to 300 feet (15 – 91 m) thick. Although the first gas production was recorded in 1939, by late 2004, there were only 24 Woodford Shale gas wells. By early 2008, there were more than 750 Woodford gas wells. Like many shale gas plays, the Woodford started with vertical wells, then became dominantly a play of horizontal wells. The play is mostly in the Arkoma Basin of southeast Oklahoma, but some drilling has extended the play west into the Anadarko Basin and south into the Ardmore Basin. Large gas producers operating in the Woodford include Devon Energy, Chesapeake Energy, Antero Resources, SM Energy, Pablo Energy, Petroquest Energy, Continental Resources, and Range Resources. In 2011, production from the Woodford Shale peaked and was declining.

== Economic impacts ==
In 2010, development of shale resources supported 600,000 jobs in the United States. Affordable domestic natural gas is essential to rejuvenating the chemical, manufacturing, and steel industries. There are concerns that these changes may be reversed if exports of natural gas increase. The American Chemistry Council determined that a 25% increase in the supply of ethane (a liquid derived from shale gas) could add over 400,000 jobs across the economy, provide over $4.4 billion annually in federal, state, and local tax revenue, and spur $16.2 billion in capital investment by the chemical industry. They also note that the relatively low price of ethane would give United States manufacturers an essential advantage over many global competitors.

Similarly, the National Association of Manufacturers estimated that high recovery of shale gas and lower natural gas prices will help U.S. manufacturers employ 1,000,000 workers by 2025 while lower feedstock and energy costs could help them reduce natural gas expenditures by as much as 11.6 billion by 2025. In December 2011, America's Natural Gas Association (ANGA) estimated that lower gas prices will add an additional $926 of disposable household income annually between 2012 and 2015, and that the amount could increase to $2,000 by 2035. Over $276 billion is going to be invested in the US Petrochemical industry and most of it in Texas. Due to emergence of shale gas, coal consumption declined from 2009.

A 2017 study finds that hydraulic fracturing contributed to job growth and higher wages: "new oil and gas extraction led to an increase in aggregate US employment of 725,000 and a 0.5 percent decrease in the unemployment rate during the Great Recession". Research shows that shale gas wells can have a significant adverse impact on some house prices, with groundwater-reliant homes declining 13% in value whereas piped-water homes will see an increase of 2–3%. The price increase of the latter is most likely due to the royalty payments that property owners get from gas extracted under their land.

The issue of whether to export natural gas has split the business community. Manufacturers such as Dow Chemical are battling energy companies such as Exxon Mobil over whether the export of natural gas should be allowed. Manufacturers want to keep gas prices low, while energy companies have been working to raise the price of natural gas by convincing the government to allow them to export natural gas to more countries. Manufacturers are concerned that increasing exports will hurt manufacturing by causing U.S. energy prices to rise. Several studies suggest that the shale gas boom has given the U.S. energy intensive manufacturing sector a competitive advantage, causing a boom in energy intensive manufacturing sector exports, suggesting that the average dollar unit of U.S. manufacturing sector exports has almost tripled its energy content between 1996 and 2012.

In 2014, many companies were cash flow negative; however, the companies that were cash flow positive were focused on quality land instead of quantity. In 2016 and 2020, worldwide oversupply caused prices for natural gas to decrease below $2 per million British thermal units - $2.50 was the minimum for US producers to be cash flow positive in 2020. US production was 92 billion cubic feet per day (Bcf/d) in 2019.

== Political impact ==
A 2025 study found that the shale gas revolution led to increased support for Republican candidates in coal-producing areas. The cheap supply of gas, enabled by hydraulic fracturing, led to displacement of coal-fired power generation, causing substantial job losses in the coal industry. Voters in coal-producing areas attributed these job losses to environmental regulations which they blamed on Democratic candidates.

A 2015 study found that shale booms increase nearby support for conservatives and conservative interests. "Support for conservative interests rises and Republican political candidates gain votes after booms, leading to a near doubling in the probability of a change in incumbency. All of this change occurs at the expense of Democrats."

== Environmental issues ==
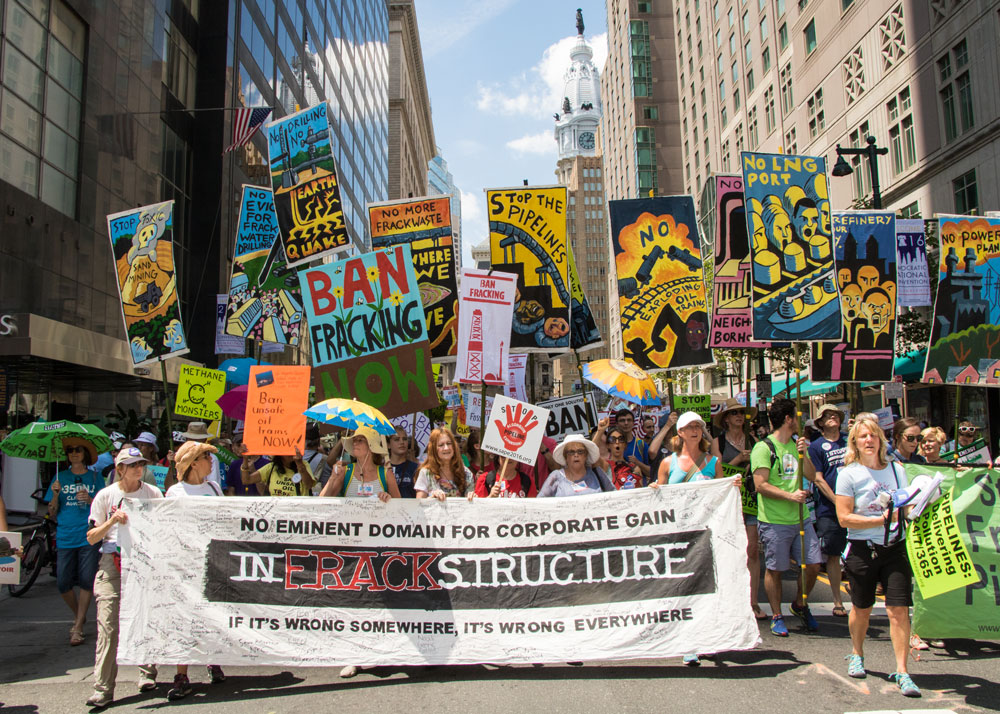
Anti-fracking protesters in Philadelphia in 2016

Complaints of uranium exposure and lack of water infrastructure emerged as environmental concerns for the rush. In Pennsylvania, controversy has surrounded the practice of releasing wastewater from "fracking" into rivers which serve as consumption reserves.

Methane release contributing to global warming is a concern.

Several shale gas sources, including the Utica Shale, Marcellus Shale, and Woodford Shale, were identified by a team of researchers publishing in Energy Policy as "carbon bombs," or a fossil fuel project that would result in more than one gigaton of carbon dioxide emissions if fully extracted and burnt.

== Popular culture ==
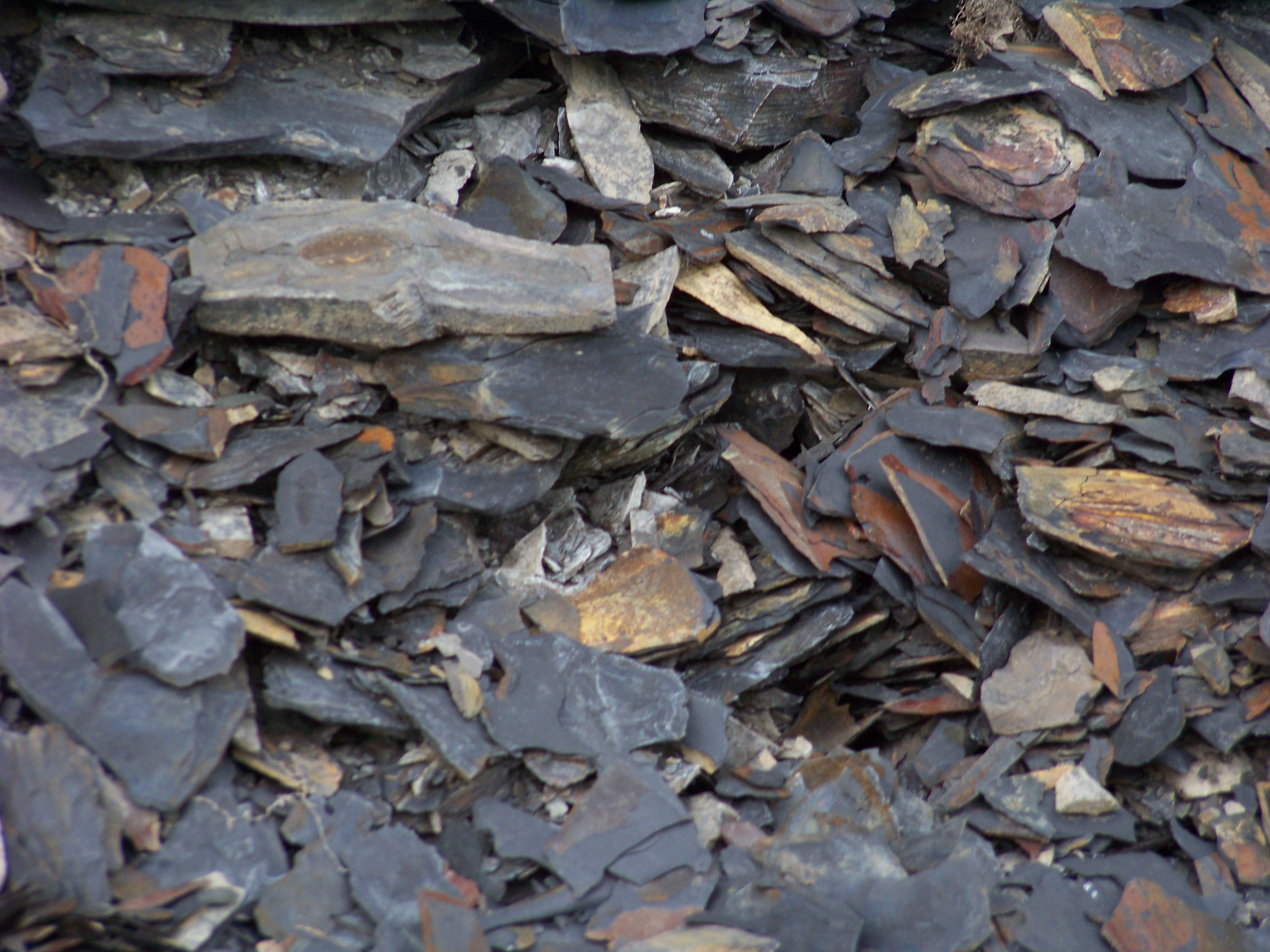
Exposed shale and foliage scattered in Marcellus, New York

The word "fracking", slang for hydraulic fracturing, has entered the English language.

The Great Shale Gas Rush refers to the growth in unconventional shale gas extraction in the early 21st century.

Pennsylvania was featured in the Academy Award-nominated, environmental documentary Gasland by Josh Fox in 2010. Most of the filming for the 2012 Gus Van Sant dramatic film Promised Land, starring Matt Damon, took place in the Pittsburgh area, although the setting is upstate New York.

== See also ==
- Fossil fuels
- Fracking in the United States
- Natural gas in the United States
- Petroleum in the United States
- Anti-fracking movement
