= Bend Arch–Fort Worth Basin =

Major petroleum producing region in Texas and Oklahoma

Bend Arch–Fort Worth Basin Province
- Country: United States
- Region: North Central Texas
- Offshore/onshore: Onshore
- Operators: Devon Energy, Chesapeake Energy, EOG Resources, Ovintiv, Range Resources, ConocoPhillips, ExxonMobil

Field history
- Discovery: 1900s
- Start of production: 1917
- Peak of production: 1960s

Production
- Current production of gas: 200×10^{6} cu ft/d (5.7×10^{6} m^{3}/d) (2002)
- Producing formations: Barnett Shale, Pennsylvanian, Permian

The Bend Arch–Fort Worth Basin Province is a major petroleum producing geological system which is primarily located in North Central Texas and southwestern Oklahoma. It is officially designated by the United States Geological Survey (USGS) as Province 045 and classified as the Barnett-Paleozoic Total Petroleum System (TPS).

== Introduction ==
Oil and gas in Province 045 are produced from carbonate and clastic rock reservoirs ranging in age from the Ordovician to the Permian. The 1995 USGS Assessment of undiscovered, technically recoverable oil and gas identified six conventional plays in Province 045, which are listed below in Table 1: One continuous unconventional play, the "Mississippian Barnett Shale" (4503), was also considered. The cumulative mean of undiscovered resource for conventional plays was: 381 million barrels (60.6×10^{6} m^{3}) of oil, 103.6 million barrels (16.47×10^{6} m^{3}) of natural gas liquids, 479 billion cubic feet (13.6×10^{9} m^{3}) associated gas, and 1,029 billion cubic feet (29.1×10^{9} m^{3}) non-associated gas.

=== Table 1 ===
1995 Play No.	1995 Play Designation	2003 AU	2003 Proposed AU Designation
4501	Pre-Mississippian	1	Ordovician Carbonate
4502	Mississippian Carbonate	2	Mississippian Pinnacle Reef
4504	Low-Pennsylvanian Sandstone & Conglomerate	3	Pennsylvanian Fluvial-Deltaic Sandstone & Conglomerate
4505	Strawn (Desmoinesian)	4	Pennsylvanian Fluvial-Deltaic Sandstone & Conglomerate
4505	Post Desmoinesian	5	Upper Pennsylvanian/Permian Clastic
4503	Mississippian Barnett Shale (Hyp)	6	Greater Newark East Fractured Siliceous Shale
4503	Mississippian Barnett Shale (Hyp)	7	Ellenburger Subcrop Fractured Barnett Shale
4503	Mississippian Barnett Shale (Hyp)	8	North Basin and Arch Fractured Shale

Notes:
1. Assessment unit number also indicates time span of stratigraphic units.

The United States Geological Survey's assessment of undiscovered conventional oil and gas and undiscovered continuous (unconventional) gas within Province 045 resulted in estimated means of 26.7 trillion cubic feet (760×10^{9} m^{3}) (Tcf) of undiscovered natural gas, 98.5 million barrels (15.66×10^{6} m^{3}) of undiscovered oil, and a mean of 1.1 billion barrels (170×10^{6} m^{3}) of undiscovered natural gas liquids. Nearly all of the undiscovered gas resource (98%, 2.62 × 10^{13} cu ft or 7.4 × 10^{11} m^{3}) is considered to be in continuous accumulations of nonassociated gas trapped in strata of two of the three Mississippian-age Barnett Shale Assessment Units (AUs) - the Greater Newark East Frac-Barrier Continuous Barnett Shale Gas AU and the Extended Continuous Barnett Shale Gas AU (2.62 × 10^{13} cu ft combined). The remaining 467 billion cubic feet (13.2×10^{9} m^{3}) of undiscovered gas resource in the province is in conventional nonassociated gas accumulations (3586 × 8^{9} billion cu ft or 1.015 × 10^{10} m^{3}) and associated/dissolved gas in conventional oil accumulations (1084 × 10^{8} billion cu ft or 3.07 billion m^{3}). The Barnett-Paleozoic TPS is estimated to contain a mean of 409.2 billion cubic feet (11.59×10^{9} m^{3}) of conventional gas, or about 88% of all undiscovered conventional gas, and about 64.6 million barrels (10.27×10^{6} m^{3}) of conventional oil, or about 65% of all undiscovered oil in Province 045.

Continuous-type accumulations include fractured shale and fractured limestone oil and gas, basin-centered gas, coal bed gas, and tight reservoir gas. They typically cover large areas, have source rocks in close association with these unconventional reservoir rocks, and are mostly gas (and in some cases oil) charged throughout their extent. Continuous accumulations commonly have transition zones that grade into more conventional accumulations.

== Boundary ==
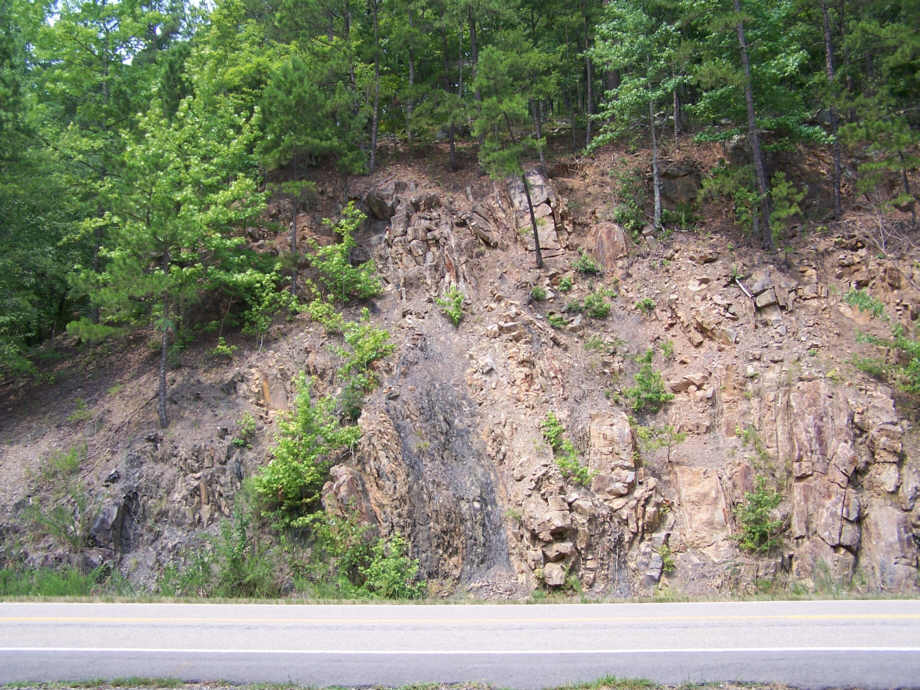
Vertical quartzite and slate strata along the eastern flank of the Ouachitas

The Fort Worth Basin and Bend Arch lie entirely within North Central Texas covering an area of 54,000 square miles (140,000 km^{2}). The southern and eastern boundaries are defined by county lines that generally follow the Ouachita structural front, although a substantial portion of this structural feature is included near Dallas. The north boundary follows the Texas-Oklahoma State line in the east, where the province includes parts of the Sherman Basin and Muenster Arch. In the west, the north boundary follows the north-east county lines of Oklahoma's three southwestern counties (Harmon, Jackson and Tillman Counties), which include the south flank of the Wichita Mountains and the Hollis Basin. The western boundary trends north-south along county lines defining the junction with the Permian Basin where part of the eastern shelf of the Permian Basin lies in Province 045.

== Structural elements ==
Major structural features include the Muenster and Red River Arches to the north, and the Bend and Lampasas Arches along the central part of Province 045. Along the east portion is an area that includes the Eastern Shelf and Concho Arch, collectively known as the Concho Platform. The Mineral Wells fault runs northeast-southwest through Palo Pinto, Parker, Wise, and Denton Counties and joins with the Newark East fault system. The fault system bisects the Newark East Field (NE-F) creating a zone of poor production in Barnett Shale gas reservoirs. Several faults that cut basement and lower Paleozoic rocks in the southern part of the province are identified at the Ordovician Ellenburger Group stratigraphic level. These faults and associated structures formed during development of the Llano Uplift and Fort Worth Basin with faulting ending by the early Missourian.

== Tectonic history ==
=== Fort Worth Basin ===
Evolution of the Fort Worth Basin and Bend Arch structures are critical to understanding burial histories and hydrocarbon generation. The asymmetrical, wedge-shaped Fort Worth Basin is a peripheral Paleozoic foreland basin with about 12,000 feet (3,700 m) of strata preserved in its deepest northeast portion adjacent to the Muenster Arch and Ouachita structural belt. The basin resembles other basins of the Ouachita structural belt, such as the Black Warrior, Arkoma, Val Verde, and Marfa Basins that formed in front of the advancing Ouachita structural belt as it was thrust onto the margin of North America. Thrusting occurred during a late Paleozoic episode of plate convergence.

=== Bend Arch ===
The Bend Arch extends north from the Llano Uplift. It is a broad subsurface, north-plunging, positive structure. The arch formed as a hingeline by down-warping of its eastern flank due to subsidence of the Fort Worth Basin during early stages of development of the Ouachita structural belt in the Late Mississippian and west tilting in the late Paleozoic which formed the Midland Basin. There is disagreement on the structural history of the Bend Arch. Flippen (1982) suggested it acted as a fulcrum and is a flexure and structural high and that only minor uplift occurred in the area to form an erosional surface on the Chester-age limestones that were deposited directly on top of the Barnett. In contrast, Cloud and Barnes (1942) suggested periodic upwarp of the Bend flexure from mid-Ordovician through Early Pennsylvanian time resulted in several unconformities. The Red River Arch and the Muenster Arch also became dominant structural features during the Late Mississippian and Early Pennsylvanian.

== General stratigraphy ==
Hydrocarbon production from Ordovician and Mississippian formations is mostly from carbonate reservoirs, whereas production in the Pennsylvanian through Lower-Permian Wolfcamp) is mostly from clastic reservoirs. The sedimentary section in the Fort Worth Basin is underlain by Precambrian granite and diorite. Cambrian rocks include granite conglomerate, sandstones, and shale that are overlain by marine carbonate rocks and shale. No production has been reported from Cambrian rocks. The Silurian, Devonian, Jurassic, and Triassic are absent in the Fort Worth Basin.

From Cambrian through Mississippian time, the Fort Worth Basin area was part of a stable cratonic shelf with deposition dominated by carbonates. Ellenburger Group carbonate rocks represent a broad epeiric carbonate platform covering most of Texas and central North America during the Early Ordovician. A pronounced drop in sea level sometime between Late Ordovician and earliest Pennsylvanian time, perhaps related to the broad, mid-North American, mid-Carboniferous unconformity, resulted in prolonged platform exposure. This erosional event removed any Silurian and Devonian rocks that may have been present. The Barnett Shale was deposited over the resulting unconformity. Provenance of the terrigenous material that constitutes the Barnett Shale was from Ouachita thrust sheets and the reactivation of older structures such as the Muenster Arch. Post-Barnett deposition continued without interruption as a sequence of extremely hard and dense limestones were laid down. These limestones have often been confused with the lower part of the overlying Marble Falls Formation (Early Pennsylsvnian), and they have never been formally named, although they are widely referenced in the literature as the "Forestburg Formation." Since the underlying Barnett is generally assumed to be Late Mississippian Chester in age, the superposed Forestburg is occasionally referred to informally as "the Chester Limestones."

As the shallow Late Mississippian seas spread southward and westward from the subsiding Southern Oklahoma Aulacogen, they inundated an uneven Lower Paleozoic surface and almost immediately initiated the growth of reef-forming organic communities. All of the Mississippian-age reef complexes whose bases have been penetrated by boreholes have been found, without exception, to be resting directly upon the underlying Ordovician rocks. But although reef growth began at the same time as Barnett Shale deposition, the reefs did not survive to the end of Barnett time; all known Chappel reefs are immediately overlain by the typical Barnett Shale facies except for a very few in central Clay County that have been very deeply breached by pre-Atokan erosion. The reef complexes are subdivisible into three constituent facies: the reef core, the reef flanks, and the inter-reef area. The reef cores are porous enough to serve as stratigraphic traps for oil and gas, and they have yielded excellent production in the northern part of the Fort Worth Basin for three-quarters of a century. The Chappel buildups are often referred to as "pinnacle reefs," but that is a misnomer. They may appear as pinnacles on a cross section with an exaggerated vertical scale (see cross sections A-A′ and B-B′ above), but in reality they have almost exactly the same height/width aspect ratio as a fried chicken egg sunny side up. The reef core, of course, is represented by the egg yolk, and the reef flank debris are represented by the egg white. The inter-reef facies is represented by a black, calcareous, bituminous shale. Where it occurs in Jack County it is typically 30 to 40 feet (9 to 12 meters) thick, and it is synonymous with the calcareous basal shale member of the Barnett. Consequently, the proximity of a given borehole to a nearby reef complex can be qualitatively estimated by the degree to which this lower member of the Barnett has been impregnated with calcite.

Clastic rocks of provenance similar to the Barnett dominate the Pennsylvanian part of the stratigraphic section in the Bend Arch–Fort Worth Basin. With progressive subsidence of the basin during the Pennsylvanian, the western basin hinge line and carbonate shelf, continued migrating west. Deposition of thick basinal clastic rocks of the Atoka, Strawn, and Canyon Formations occurred at this time. These Mid- and Late Pennsylvanian rocks consist mostly of sandstones and conglomerates with fewer and thinner limestone beds.

== Petroleum production history ==
Hydrocarbon shows were first encountered in Province 045 during the mid-nineteenth century while drilling water wells. Sporadic exploration began following the Civil War, and the first commercial oil discoveries occurred in the early 1900s. In 1917, discovery of Ranger field stimulated one of the largest exploration and development "booms" in Texas. The Ranger field produces from the Atoka-Bend formation, a sandstone-conglomerate reservoir that directly overlies the Barnett formation. Operators drilled more than 1,000 wildcats in and around the Fort Worth Basin attempting to duplicate the success of Ranger. These wildcat efforts resulted in the discovery of more fields and production from numerous other reservoirs including Strawn fluvial/deltaic sandstones, Marble Falls carbonate bank limestones, the Barnett siliceous shale, and occasional upper Ellenburger dolomitic limestones. By 1960, the province reached a mature stage of exploration and development as demonstrated by the high density and distribution of well penetrations and productive wells. A majority of the commercial hydrocarbons consist of oil in Pennsylvanian reservoirs.

Province 045 is among the more active drilling areas during the resurgence of domestic drilling, which began after the OPEC oil embargo in 1973. It has consistently appeared on the list of the ten most active provinces in terms of wells completed and footage drilled. More than 9100 oil wells and 4,520 gas wells were drilled and completed in this area from 1974 to 1980.

Cumulative production in Province 045 from conventional reservoirs prior to the 1995 USGS Assessment was 2 billion barrels (320×10^{6} m^{3}) of oil, 7.8 trillion cubic feet (220×10^{9} m^{3}) of gas, and 500 million barrels (79×10^{6} m^{3}) of natural gas liquids. Cumulative gas production from the Barnett Shale for the first half of 2002 was 94 billion cubic feet (2.7×10^{9} m^{3}); annual production for 2002 was estimated at 200 billion cubic feet (5.7×10^{9} m^{3}).

=== Petroleum data: selected fields ===
Field	County	Cumulative oil production		Cumulative gas production		Reserves	Discovery
Field	County	million barrels	million cubic meters	billion cubic feet	million cubic meters	Reserves	Discovery
Newark East	Wise, Denton			200	5,700	2.5 trillion cubic feet (71×10^{9} m^{3}) of gas	1981
Boonsville	Wise, Jack	245	39.0	5,500	160,000	GOF	1950
Ranger	Wichita	78	12.4			Abandoned	1917
Fry	Brown						1926
TOGA	Lampasas						2006
Shackelford	Shackelford					10 million barrels (1.6×10^{6} m^{3}) of oil	1954
Lee Ray	Eastland			19	540		1978
Breckeridge	Stephens	147	23.4			GOF	1919
KMA	Wichita	184	29.3			GOF	1931
Fargo	Wilbarger	34	5.4				1940
Branch South	NA			16	450		1983
Lake Abilene	Taylor					-	Note: GOF = giant oil fields (>500 million barrels of oil equivalent)

== Source rock ==
The primary source rock of the Bend Arch–Fort Worth Basin is Mississippian Chester-age Barnett Shale, perhaps including the overlying Chesterian Forestburg Formation. The Barnett commonly exhibits an uncommonly high gamma-ray log response. Other potential source rocks of secondary importance are Early Pennsylvanian and include dark fine-grained carbonate rock and shale units within the Marble Falls Limestone and the black shale facies of the Smithwick/Atoka Shale. The Barnett Shale was deposited over much of North Central Texas; however, because of post-depositional erosion, the present distribution of Barnett is limited to Province 045. The Barnett/Forestburg Chesterian interval is over 1,000 feet (300 m) thick along the southwest flank of the Muenster Arch. It is eroded in areas along the Red River-Electra and Muenster Arches to the north, the Llano uplift to the south where it outcrops, and the easternmost portion of the province where the Barnett laps onto the Eastern Shelf-Concho Platform.

Average total organic carbon (TOC) content in the Barnett Shale is about 4% and TOC is as high as 12% in samples from outcrops along the Llano uplift on the south flank of the Fort Worth Basin. It has geochemical characteristics similar to other Devonian-Mississippian black shales found elsewhere in the US (e.g., Woodford, Bakken, New Albany, and Chattanooga Formations). These black shales all contain oil-prone organic matter (Type II kerogen) based on hydrogen indices above 350 milligrams of hydrocarbons per gram of TOC and generate a similar type of high quality oil (low sulfur, >30 API gravity). Although kerogen cracking decomposition is a source of oil and gas from the Barnett Shale, the principal source of gas in the Newark East Field is from cracking of oil and bitumen.

== Thermal maturity ==
Low maturation levels in the Barnett Shale at vitrinite reflectance (Ro), estimated at 0.6-0.7%, yield oils of 38° API gravity in Brown County. Oils found in Shackelford, Throckmorton, and Callahan Counties as well, as in Montague County, are derived from Barnett Shale at the middle of the zone of oil generation (oil window) thermal maturities levels (≈0.9% Ro). Although condensate is associated with gas production in Wise County, Barnett source rock maturity is generally 1.1% Ro or greater. The zone of wet gas generation is in the 1.1-1.4% Ro range, whereas the primary zone of dry gas generation (main gas window) begins at a Ro of 1.4%.

Thermal maturity of Barnett Shale can also be derived from TOC and Rock-Eval (Tmax) measurements. Although Tmax is not very reliable for high maturity kerogens due to poor pyrolysis peak yields and peak shape, the extent of kerogen transformation can be utilized. For example, Barnett Shale having a 4.5% TOC and a hydrogen index of less than 100 is in the wet or dry gas windows with equivalent Ro values greater than 1.1% TOC. In contrast, low maturity Barnett Shale from Lampasas County outcrops have initial TOC values averaging about 12% with hydrocarbon potentials averaging 9.85% by volume. A good average value for Barnett Shale is derived from the Mitcham #1 well in Brown County where TOC is 4.2% and hydrocarbon potential is 3.37% by volume. Using these data we can determine TOC values will decrease 36% during maturation from the immature stage to the gas-generation window. Samples from the T. P. Simms well in the Newark East gas-producing area have average TOC values of 4.5%, but greater than 90% of the organic matter is converted to hydrocarbons. Thus, its original TOC was about 7.0% with an initial estimated potential of 5.64% by volume. Any oil generated would be expelled into shallow (or deeper) horizons as in the west and north, or cracked to gas where measured vitrinite reflectance is above 1.1% Ro.

== Hydrocarbon generation ==
The Barnett Shale is thermally mature for hydrocarbon generation over most of its area. Barnett source rock is presently in the oil-generation window along the north and west parts of the province, and in the gas window on the east half of the Barnett-Paleozoic TPS. Expulsion of high-quality oil from the Barnett was episodic and began at low (Ro = 0.6%) thermal maturity. Thirty-two oils from Wise and Jack Counties were analyzed to determine the characteristics of the generating source rock. API gravity and sulfur content were integrated with high-resolution gas chromatography (GC) and Gas chromatography-mass spectrometry (GCMS) analyses. The API gravity of the oils ranges from 35° to 62° and sulfur contents are low (<0.2%), which is characteristic of high thermal maturity oils. Biomarkers from GCMS analyses show oils were sourced from marine shale, based on sterane distribution and the presence of diasteranes. Carbon isotopic analyses of saturated and aromatic hydrocarbon fractions support hydrocarbon generation from a single-source unit. In the main gas-producing area of fractured Barnett Shale, the gas generation window is along a trend sub-parallel to the Ouachita thrust front. Jarvie (2001) reported the British Thermal Unit (BTU) content of Barnett gas is directly proportional to Ro levels.

== Reservoir rocks ==
Reservoir rocks include clastic and carbonate rocks ranging in age from Ordovician to Early Permian. Most production from conventional reservoirs is from Pennsylvanian rocks, whereas the only recognized production from unconventional accumulations is from Mississippian fractured Barnett Shale and early Pennsylvanian (Morrowan) fractured Marble Falls Limestone. Conglomerate of the Pennsylvanian Bend Group is the main producing reservoir in the Boonsville Bend Field with cumulative production through 2001 exceeding 3 trillion cubic feet (85×10^{9} m^{3}) of gas. Oil sourced from Barnett Shale is produced from numerous reservoir rocks in the Bend Arch–Fort Worth Basin, including Barnett Shale, Caddo Formation, Canyon Group, Marble Falls Formation, Chappel Limestone, Bend Group, and Ellenburger Group.

=== Seal rocks ===
Seal rocks in the Barnett-Paleozoic TPS are mostly shale units and dense, low permeability carbonate rock that are distributed on both regional and local scales. Although these formations are not considered seal rocks in areas where they are tight and not water wet, they serve as barriers confining hydraulic-induced fracturing (frac barriers) and help retain formation pressures during well stimulation.

=== Traps ===
Traps for conventional hydrocarbon accumulations are mostly stratigraphic for carbonate rock reservoirs and both structural and stratigraphic in clastic-rock reservoirs. Stratigraphic traps in carbonate rocks result from a combination of facies and depositional topography, erosion, updip pinchout of facies, and diagenetically controlled enhanced-permeability and porosity zones. A good example of a carbonate stratigraphic trap is the pinnacle reef traps of the Chappel Limestone, where local porous grainstone and packstone are restricted to isolated buildups or reef clusters on the eroded Ellenburger Group. Chappel pinnacle reefs are draped and sealed by the overlying Barnett Shale. Stratigraphic traps in Pennsylvanian Atoka sandstones and conglomerates are mainly pinch outs related to facies changes or erosional truncation.

== Fractured Barnett Shale ==
Lesser amounts of high-quality (35-40° API gravity, low sulfur) oil is produced from Barnett Shale in the province's north and western portions where it exhibits low thermal maturity (Ro ≈ 0.6%). Similar quality oils (40-50° API gravity), and condensates associated with gas are produced in Wise County where the Barnett is of higher thermal maturity. Gas production is from hydraulically fractured black siliceous shale. Calorific values of gases from NE-F commonly range between 1,050 and 1,300 BTU. The Barnett's main producing facies is a black, organic-rich siliceous shale with a mean composition of about 45% quartz, 27% clay (mostly illite/smectite, and illite), 10% carbonate (calcite, dolomite, and siderite), 5% feldspar, 5% pyrite, and 5% TOC. Average porosity in the productive portions is about 6% and matrix permeability is measured in nanodarcies.

Three assessment units have been proposed for the Barnett Shale continuous accumulations, each with different geologic and production characteristics:

1. a NE-F gas "sweet spot" where the Barnett is siliceous, thick, within the gas generation window, slightly overpressured, and enclosed by dense, tight overlying Forestburg Limestone and underlying Viola Limestone and Simpson Group as frac barriers;
2. an outlying area where the Barnett is within the gas-generation window but the subcrop is the porous Ellenburger and the overlying Marble Falls Limestone barrier may be absent; and
3. an area of lesser potential where overlying and underlying barriers may be absent and production includes oil and gas from fractured Barnett Shale.

The siliceous nature of the Barnett Shale, and its relation to fracture enhancement in NE-F, was noted by Lancaster. Also, the second assessment unit, where the Barnett Shale subcrop is Ellenburger Group carbonate rocks, is being tested by several operators. The unit's resource potential will be guided by the results of current testing with directional wells and various completion methods to determine optimum completion techniques for gas recovery.

Historically, estimated ultimate recoveries (EURs) for Barnett gas wells at NE-F increased with time, as follows:

1. 300 to 500 million cubic feet (8.5 million to 14 million m^{3}) of gas before 1990;
2. 600 to 1000 million cubic feet (17 million to 28 million m^{3}) of gas between 1990 and 1997; and
3. 800 to 1200 million cubic feet (23 million to 34 million m^{3}) of gas between 1998 and 2000.

In 2002, Devon Energy reported the mean EUR for Newark East Barnett gas wells is 1.25 billion cubic feet (35×10^{6} m^{3}) of gas. The progressive increase in EUR in Barnett wells is the result of improved geologic and engineering concepts that guide development of the Barnett continuous gas play. Moreover, recompletion of wells after about five years of production commonly adds 759 million cubic feet (21.5×10^{6} m^{3}) to its EUR.

== See also ==
- East Texas oil field
- Barnett Shale
