= John W. Barnett =

Texas farmer, merchant, and community leader

John W. Barnett (c. 1800 – 1876) was a Texas farmer, merchant, and community leader who with his sons-in-law, Burrell L. and Thomas P. C. Hamrick, settled a large tract of land in San Saba County, Texas, and founded the town that became Barnett Springs, Texas. Barnett was the first farmer in the county to irrigate crops and helped organize San Saba County.

Geologists surveying the area's oil and natural gas reserves early in the 20th century found a formation notable for its dark shale and named it the Barnett Shale, with Oklahoma's Woodford Shale now ranked as one of North America's largest contiguous underground deposits of natural gas.

Barnett was born in Georgia in about 1800 to William and Nancy Barnett. He married Zilphia Walpole in 1823 and settled in Pine Springs, Lauderdale County, Mississippi. In 1845, he left his family and traveled west to fight in the Mexican War for the liberation of Texas, earning the rank of captain. After the war, he was awarded a land grant to farm in what became San Saba County, Texas. His brother Joseph had already settled in Caldwell County, Texas.

In 1848, Barnett returned to Mississippi to retrieve his wife, three daughters, and son, who then accompanied him by wagon train to Texas to settle at a location on either side of the San Saba River called Simpson's Creek. The location has since become known as Barnett Springs.
