= Barnett Shale =

Geological formation in Texas, United States

Coordinates: 33°N 98°W

- Country: United States
- Region: Bend Arch-Fort Worth Basin, Texas
- Offshore/onshore: Onshore
- Operators: Devon Energy, Total S.A., EOG Resources, XTO Energy, Range Resources, Ovintiv, ConocoPhillips

Field history
- Discovery: 1980s
- Start of production: 1999

Production
- Estimated gas in place: 2.1–30×10^{12} cu ft (59–850×10^{9} m^{3})
- Producing formations: Barnett Shale

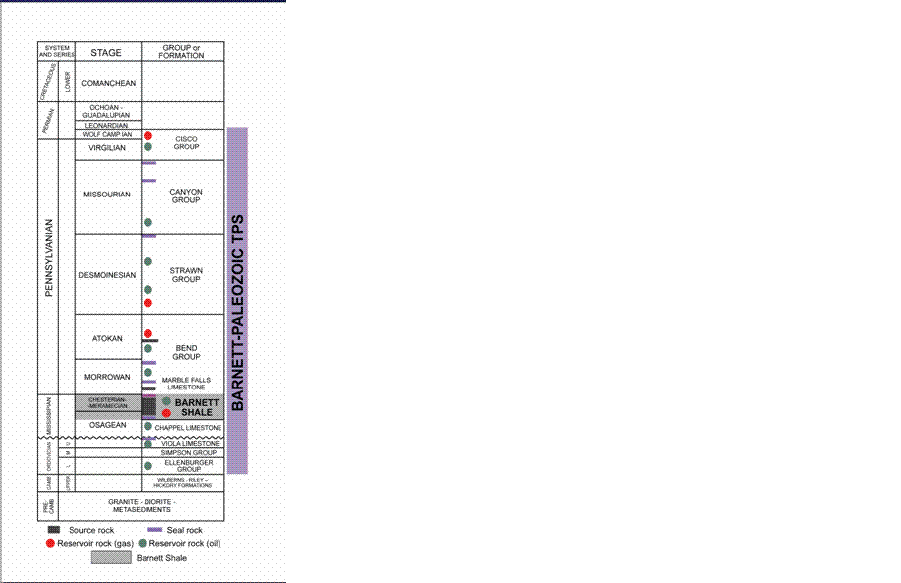
Barnett Shale - stratigraphy

The Barnett Shale is a geological formation located in the Bend Arch-Fort Worth Basin. It consists of sedimentary rocks dating from the Mississippian period (354–323 million years ago) in Texas. The formation underlies the city of Fort Worth and underlies 5,000 mi^{2} (13,000 km^{2}) and at least 17 counties.

As of 2007, some experts suggested that the Barnett Shale might have the largest producible reserves of any onshore natural gas field in the United States. The field is thought to have 2.5×10^{12} cu ft (71 km^{3}) of recoverable natural gas, and 30×10^{12} cu ft (850 km^{3}) of natural gas in place. Oil also has been found in lesser quantities, but sufficient (with high oil prices) to be commercially viable.

The Barnett Shale is known as an unconventional "tight" gas reservoir, indicating that the gas is not easily extracted. The shale is very impermeable, and it was virtually impossible to produce gas in commercial quantities from this formation until oil and gas companies learned how to effectively use massive hydraulic fracturing in the formation. The use of horizontal drilling further improved the economics, and made it easier to extract gas from under developed areas.

Future development of the field will be hampered in part by the fact that major portions of the field are in urban areas, including the rapidly growing Dallas-Fort Worth Metroplex. Some local governments are researching means by which they can drill on existing public land (e.g., parks) without disrupting other activities so they may obtain royalties on any minerals found, whereas others are seeking compensation from drilling companies for damage to roads caused by overweight vehicles (many of the roads are rural and not designed for use by heavy equipment). In addition, drilling and exploration have generated significant controversy because of environmental damage including contamination to the ground water sources.

== Name ==
The formation is named after John W. Barnett, who settled in San Saba County during the late 19th century, where he named a local stream the Barnett Stream. In the early 20th century during a geological mapping expedition, scientists noted a thick black organic-rich shale in an outcrop close to the stream. The shale was consequently named the Barnett Shale.

The Barnett shale has acted as a source and sealing cap rock for more conventional oil and gas reservoirs in the area.

== History of the Newark, East Gas Field ==
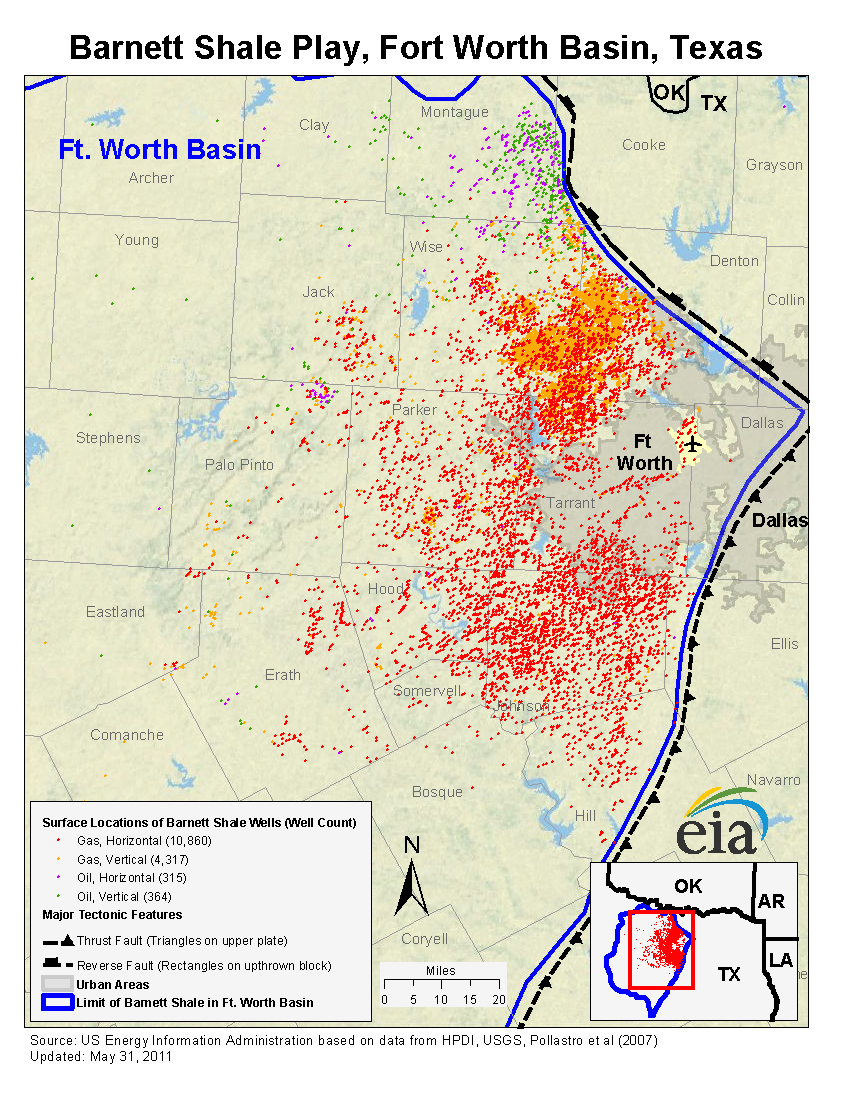
Map of gas wells in the Barnett Shale, Texas

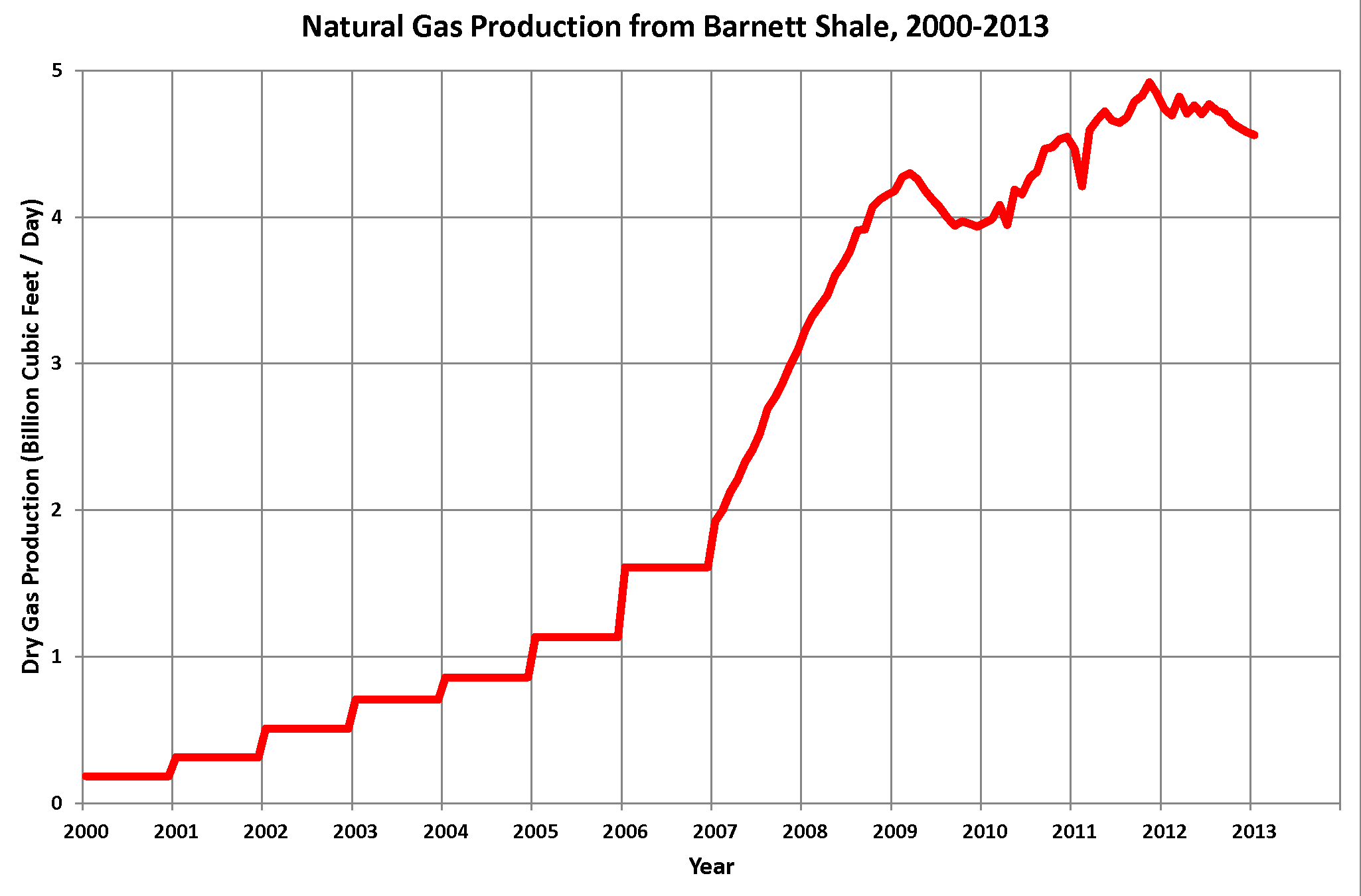
Gas production from Barnett Shale

Gas wells producing from the Barnett Shale of the Fort Worth basin are designated as the Newark, East Gas Field by the Texas Railroad Commission. From 2002 to 2010 the Barnett was the most productive source of shale gas in the US; it is now third, behind the Marcellus Formation and the Haynesville Shale. In January 2013, the Barnett produced 4.56 billion cubic feet per day, which made up 6.8% of all the natural gas produced in the US.

=== Discovery and Mitchell Energy years ===
The field was discovered in 1981 when Mitchell Energy drilled and completed the C. W. Slay #1 near Newark, Texas, in Wise County. The well was drilled vertically, completed with a nitrogen foam frac, and did not produce enough gas to cause any excitement.

Despite the low production rate, Mitchell Energy owner George P. Mitchell was convinced that he could find a better way to produce gas from the Barnett. Mitchell persevered for years in the face of low production rates in his initial wells, low gas prices, and low profitability. Industry commentators have written that few, if any, other companies would have continued drilling well after well in the Barnett Shale. Mitchell is widely credited with personally making a success of the Barnett Shale, and thus creating the gas production boom in the Barnett, and, when other companies imitated his techniques, many other shale-gas and tight-oil successes in the US and other countries.

Incrementally, Mitchell Energy found ways to increase production. Early on, Mitchell abandoned the foam frac, which had been used with some success in Appalachian Basin shales, and found that gel fracs worked better in the Barnett. In 1986, Mitchell Energy applied the first massive hydraulic frac, a gel frac, to the Barnett Shale.

In 1991, Mitchell Energy, with a subsidy from the federal government, drilled the first horizontal well in the Barnett, but the experiment was not considered a success. It was not until 1998 that Mitchell drilled two more horizontal wells; they were technical successes, but economic failures. Mitchell's fourth and last horizontal attempt was made in 2000, but ran into drilling problems and was abandoned.

The largest breakthrough in the Barnett came in 1997, when Mitchell Energy petroleum engineer Nick Steinsberger suggested that a slickwater frac, which was being successfully used by other companies in wells to the Cotton Valley Sandstone of east Texas, might work better in the Barnett Shale than the gel fracs. By going against conventional wisdom and switching to the slickwater frac, Mitchell Energy not only lowered the cost of completing wells by $75,000 to $100,000, but also dramatically increased the recovery of gas. Mitchell tried to buy more leases in the area before word spread, but soon many other operators started buying leases and drilling Barnett wells, in what had been until then essentially a Mitchell Energy play.

=== Other operators join in ===
Mitchell Energy had a near-monopoly in drilling Barnett Shale wells in the early years of the field. In 1995, for instance, Mitchell completed 70 Barnett wells, while all other operators combined completed three. This was largely because the Barnett was marginal economically: according to a former CEO, Mitchell had invested about $250 million in the Barnett from 1981 to 1997, and had not recouped its costs. But after 1997, competitors realized that Mitchell had discovered how to extract gas profitably, they, too started buying leases and drilling Barnett wells, at a pace that Mitchell could not match. In 2001, for the first time, Mitchell completed fewer than half the Barnett Shale wells (258 wells, versus 260 by other operators).

George Mitchell sold Mitchell Energy to Devon Energy in 2002.

Helped by better drilling technology, the difficulties of drilling near populated areas, and higher gas prices in the 2000s, horizontal wells became more economic and practical, and in 2005 new horizontal wells outnumbered new vertical wells in the Barnett for the first time. In 2008, 2901 horizontal wells were completed in the Barnett, versus just 183 vertical wells.

It was thought that only a few of the thicker sections close to Fort Worth would be able to support economic drilling, until new advances in horizontal drilling were developed in the 1980s. Techniques such as fracturing, or "fracking", wells, used by Mitchell Energy, opened the possibility of more large scale production. Even with new techniques, significant drilling did not begin until gas prices increased in the late 1990s.

=== Current status ===
As of 2012, the Newark, East Field extended into 24 counties, with permits issued for wells in a 25th county, Hamilton. The field had more than 16,000 producing wells. Gas production in 2011 was 2.0 trillion cubic feet. The field was the largest gas producer in Texas, and made up 31% of Texas gas production. Proved reserves as of the end of 2011 were 32.6 trillion cubic feet of gas and 118 million barrels of oil or condensate.

== Well completion ==
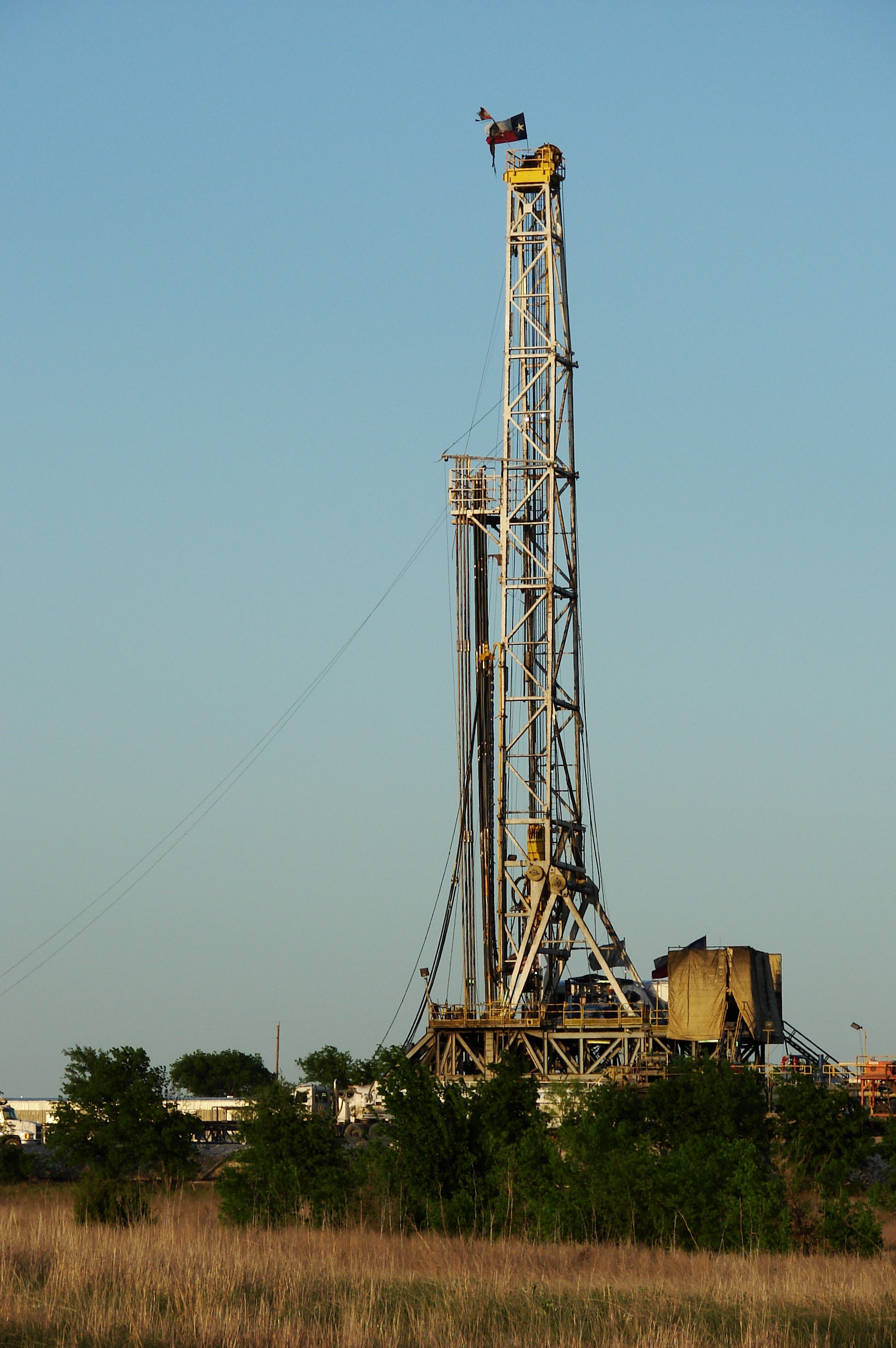
Barnett Shale gas drilling rig near Alvarado, Texas (2008)

Two key developments in well design and completions have fostered development of the Barnett Shale. These are horizontal drilling, and hydraulic fracturing.

=== Horizontal drilling ===
Horizontal drilling has increased the potential of the Barnett Shale as a major source of natural gas. Horizontal drilling has changed the way oil and gas drilling is done by allowing producers access to reservoirs which were otherwise too thin to be economically viable through vertical drilling. Much of the gas in the Barnett Shale is beneath the City of Fort Worth. The new technology has attracted a number of gas-production companies.

In addition to extended reach, horizontal drilling drastically increases production. In "tight" rock (low permeability) like the Barnett Shale, the gas uses fractures to move out of the rock and into the wellbore. The fractures may be natural or induced (see below). A horizontal well exposes more rock (and therefore more fractures) to the wellbore because it is usually designed with the horizontal portion of the well in the productive formation.

In 2005–2007 horizontal drilling in the Barnett Shale extended south into Johnson, Hill, and Bosque counties, with a 100% success rate on completed wells. An experimental vertical well is being drilled in McLennan County (near Waco) to assess the potential for drilling along the Ouachita Fold, a geological barrier which defines the southern limit of the Barnett Shale.

Although horizontal wells are now the norm, as of early 2013, some vertical wells were still being drilled in the Barnett.

=== Hydraulic fracturing ===
Hydraulic fracturing carried out in the Barnett Shale is done by pumping a mixture of water, sand, and various chemical additives (to affect viscosity, flow rates, etc.) into the well bore at a sufficient pressure to create and propagate a fracture in the surrounding rock formation down hole. This is crucial in low permeability rock as it exposes more of the formation to the well bore and greater volumes of gas can be produced by the increased surface area. Without hydraulic fracturing, the wells would not produce at an economically feasible rate.

In 1997, Nick Steinsberger, an engineer of Mitchell Energy (now part of Devon Energy), applied the slickwater fracturing technique, using more water and higher pump pressure than previous fracturing techniques, which was used in East Texas in the Barnett Shale of north Texas. In 1998, the new technique proved to be successful when the first 90 days gas production from the well called S.H. Griffin No. 3 exceeded production of any of the company's previous wells.

Scientists at the Jackson School of Geosciences at the University of Texas at Austin, who have worked closely with producing companies to develop the Barnett play, also see potential for conflict in some parts of the Barnett where water use for hydraulic fracturing could compete with other uses such as drinking and agriculture.

The process of hydraulic fracturing generates significant criticism. Opponents allege that it is inadequately monitored and poses significant threats to water and air quality in surrounding areas, and cite a growing number of incidents of methane in nearby water wells.

== Economic impact ==
As of September 2008, gas producers said that bonuses paid to landowners in the southern counties ranged from $200 to $28,000 per acre ($500–69,000/ha), the higher prices being paid by Vantage Energy in the fall of 2008. Royalty payments in the 18–25% range. One lease in Johnson County now has 19 wells permitted.

A Fort Worth Star-Telegram article reported more than 100,000 new leases were recorded in Tarrant County in 2007. Terms of recent leases have included $15,000 per acre ($37,000/ha) and a 25% royalty for homeowners in Ryan Place, Mistletoe Heights, and Berkley on Fort Worth's south side, and $22,500 per acre and a 25% royalty for a group of homeowners in south Arlington. More recent articles in the Fort Worth Weekly report that many signed lease agreements have not been honored, with lessors alleging that they were paid significantly less than promised or were not paid at all.

Oil industry advocates claim that by 2015 the Barnett Shale may be responsible for more than 108,000 jobs. Critics say that tax revenues may be offset by cleanup costs for toxic byproducts of gas drilling, such as benzene and naturally occurring radioactive material (NORM). Environmental groups have pressured state regulators to begin forcing cleanups. The San Juan Citizens Alliance has sued to force the EPA to tighten regulations. Ed Ireland, of the Barnett Shale Energy Council (an industry advocacy group) has said that he believes regulation will increase under the Obama administration; as of 2012, this has not been the case.

A 2011 study for the Fort Worth Chamber of Commerce concluded that the Barnett Shale development was responsible for 119,000 jobs in Texas, 100,000 of them in the Fort Worth region.

An expanded gas pipeline network for transporting the gas to market is being sought. The completion of a 42-inch (1,100 mm) natural gas transmission pipeline through Hill County may open up new areas for drilling.

=== Proved reserves ===
- 2010, US Energy Information Administration: 31.0 trillion cubic feet of gas
- 2011, US Energy Information Administration: 32.6 trillion cubic feet of gas, 118 million barrels of oil

== Operators in the Barnett ==
According to the Texas Railroad Commission, as of 2012 there were 235 operators (companies which manage producing wells) in the Barnett Shale. In terms of gas volumes produced, the top ten operators, in order of decreasing gas production, were:

- Chesapeake Energy
- XTO Energy
- EOG Resources
- Enervest Operating, L.L.C.
- Quicksilver Resources
- Carrizo Oil & Gas, Inc.
- EagleRidge Energy
- Barnett Shale Operating

== Geography of Barnett Shale ==
The Barnett Shale has been classified into "Core" and "Non-Core" areas of production. To date production has concentrated in the Core area where the shale is thicker and the uncertainty is reduced. This allows for the wells to be drilled at slightly lower gas prices than those in Non-core areas.

=== Core ===
- Denton (active)
- Johnson (active)
- Tarrant (active)
- Wise (active)

=== Non-core ===
- Dallas County, Texas (active)
- Bosque (potential)
- Comanche (potential)
- Cooke (active)
- Ellis (potential)
- Erath (active)
- Hamilton (potential)
- Hill (active)
- Hood (active)
- Jack (potential)
- Montague (active)
- Palo Pinto (active)
- Parker (active)
- Somervell (active)

Operators, such as EOG Resources, Gulftex Operating, Inc, and Devon Energy, stated in public reports in mid-2005 that they estimate that one third to one half of the land in the counties that contain the Barnett Shale, including the most heavily prospected counties like Johnson and Tarrant, will get wells. There have been few dry holes drilled, because technology like 3D Seismic allows operators to identify potential hazards before they drill and avoid bad areas. Some of the hazards include faults and karst features (sinkholes). Faults may divert hydraulic fracturing, reducing its effectiveness, and karst features may contain abundant water that limits the production of gas.

== Controversy ==
Several groups in communities in which gas wells have been located have complained of high risk of catastrophic accidents, and some allege that accidents have already occurred, including several resulting in fatalities.

Some environmental groups and north Texas residents have expressed concern about the effects of drilling on air and water quality in the areas surrounding the wells and pipelines.

In 2010, the Environmental Protection Agency (EPA) issued an emergency order against Range Resources, stating that the company's drilling activities in Parker County, Texas had contaminated at least two residential drinking water wells. The company denied the allegations, and said the presence of methane was a result of naturally occurring migration, and had shown up in nearby water wells long before Range drilled its gas wells. However, after a January 2011 Texas Railroad Commission (TRRC) hearing, TRRC staff concluded that, based on chemical composition, the gas in the water wells came from the shallow Strawn Formation, rather than the deeper Barnett Shale, in which the Range wells were completed. They also concluded that pressure tests by Range showed mechanical integrity of the casing. EPA and the two homeowners were invited to present evidence at the TRRC hearing, but did not. In March 2012, the EPA dropped its order against Range.

The mayor of DISH, Texas complained that air pollution from a natural gas compressor station was sickening his family. However, in May 2010, The Texas Department of State Health Services released air quality results for DISH, including tests of blood and urine samples from 28 DISH residents that were tested for volatile organic compounds (VOCs). The agency concluded: “The information obtained from this investigation did not indicate that community-wide exposures from gas wells or compressor stations were occurring in the sample population. This conclusion was based on the pattern of VOC values found in the samples. Other sources of exposure such as cigarette smoking, the presence of disinfectant by-products in drinking water, and consumer or occupational/hobby related products could explain many of the findings.”

Texas environmental regulators and the EPA have ordered the Texas Commission on Environmental Quality to begin investigating drilling complaints on-site within 12 hours of reception.

Numerous lawsuits against companies operating in the Barnett Shale allege that companies have reneged on promised lease payments, altered agreements after the fact, or failed to meet their commitments to lessors of land in the shale.

== Legacy ==
The profit potential of the Barnett Shale gas play has spurred companies to search for other sources of shale gas across the United States. Other shale gas prospects in the United States include the Antrim Shale in Michigan, the Fayetteville Shale in Arkansas, the Marcellus Shale in Appalachia, the Woodford Shale in Oklahoma, the Ohio Shale in Kentucky and West Virginia and the Haynesville Shale in Louisiana and East Texas.

== See also ==
- Shale gas in the United States

== Bibliography ==
- Scott L. Montgomery, Gas-Shale Play With Multi-Trillion Cubic Foot Potential; Fact Book.
