= Subcrop =

Term in geology

Subcrop is a term in geology. It is a contrast to the term outcrop, if not a perfect antonym.

If rocks exposed at the present-day erosion surface are referred to as outcrops, then now-buried rocks that were exposed at ancient erosion surfaces are referred to as subcrops.

So, a subcrop is buried. If part of a geological formation is close to the surface, it is a subcrop. A subcrop is not outcropping, and is usually under the soil profile or alluvial sediments.

== External links and references ==
- A reference
- A second reference
- A third reference
