= Range Resources =

American energy company

Range Resources Corporation
- Type: Public company
- Traded as: NYSE: RRC; S&P 400 component
- Industry: Petroleum industry
- Founded: 1976; 50 years ago
- Headquarters: Fort Worth, Texas, U.S.
- Key people: Dennis L. Degner, President & CEO; Mark S. Schucchi, CFO
- Products: Petroleum; Natural gas
- Production output: 2.24 billion cubic feet of natural gas equivalent per day (2025)
- Revenue: ▲US$3.115 billion (2025)
- Net income: ▲US$658 million (2025)
- Total assets: ▲US$7.421 billion (2025)
- Total equity: ▲US$4.318 billion (2025)
- Number of employees: 564 (2026)
- Website: www.rangeresources.com

Range Resources Corporation is a natural gas exploration and production company, the headquartered is in Fort Worth, Texas. It operates in the Marcellus Formation, where it is the largest land owner.

As of December 31, 2025, the company had 18.141 trillion cubic feet of natural gas equivalent of estimated proved reserves, which 64% was natural gas, 35% was natural gas liquids, and 1% was petroleum.

== History ==
In 1976, the company was founded as Lomak Petroleum, based in Hartville, Ohio. The company drilled wells in eastern Ohio.

In 1992, the company moved its headquarters to Fort Worth, Texas.

In 1997, the company acquired American Cometra for $385 million, which owned properties in the Permian Basin. It also acquired assets from Cabot Oil & Gas for $92.5 million.

In 1998, the company acquired Domain Energy for $214 million. The company also changed its name to Range Resources Corporation.

In 1999, the company formed a 50-50 joint venture with FirstEnergy called Great Lakes Energy Partners LLC to own properties in the Appalachian Basin. In 2004, the company bought the 50% interest in the venture that it did not own for $290 million, including the assumption of debt.

Before its major expansion into the Marcellus Shale, the company only held a small position in the Texas Barnett Shale and 9,000 "worn-out gas wells across the Appalachian basin that had been producing for 25 years". However, geologist William Zagorski, who worked for the company, used the knowledge of hydraulic fracturing gained working in the Barnett Shale (pioneered in the region by Mitchell Energy & Development) to attempt hydraulic fracturing in Appalachia, where according to CEO Jeffrey Ventura, "it worked on the first try".

In 2004, the company began operations in the Marcellus Shale in Pennsylvania.

In 2005, the company built horizontal test wells in Mount Pleasant Township, Washington County, Pennsylvania and began production in the Marcellus Shale and in 2007, the company spent $200 million to acquire additional land nearby.

In 2006, the company acquired Stroud Energy and its major position in the Barnett Shale for $450 million.

In 2010, Forbes called the company "King of the Marcellus Shale".The company had spent less than $1,000 per acre on average to acquire land suitable for drilling, compared to larger traditional oil and gas players who joined the exploration rush late in the game who had paid as much as $14,000 an acre.

In 2014, the company exchanged its assets in the Permian Basin with EQT Corporation for assets in the Nora Field in Virginia plus $145 million in cash.

In 2015, the company sold its assets in the Nora Field in Virginia to EnerVest for $875 million.

In 2016, the company acquired Memorial Resource Development for $4.2 billion in stock.

== Environmental issues ==
=== Chemicals used in hydraulic fracturing ===
In 2010, the company announced that it would list on its website the chemicals, including their volume, concentration and purpose, used in its each well completed via hydraulic fracturing. However, in 2011 court documents showed that the company does not know the makeup of the fracking fluids used.

=== Water and air pollution in Washington County, Pennsylvania ===
This American Life and The New York Times investigated the company's operations in Amwell Township and Mount Pleasant Township, Washington County, Pennsylvania. Journalists Eliza Griswold and Sarah Koenig found allegations that gas wells owned by Range Resources caused water pollution and air pollution. Residents complained of black running water that corroded faucets and household machinery, showers smelling of "rotten eggs" (hydrogen sulfide) and diarrhea, "mysterious stomach pains", extreme fatigue or anemia. Medical tests of residents complaining of headaches, nosebleeds and the inability to concentrate showed elevated blood levels of organic solvents and heavy metals such as toluene and arsenic. When presented with such complaints, the company argued that its labs' test results show that complaints of illness and dying animals were not caused by its activities and instead had other causes.

According to a letter from the company to a complainant dated January 14, 2011, "On November 10, 2010, you voluntarily supplied Range Resources with lab results from both your dog and horse veterinarians. Upon review of these results, Range contacted the canine and equine veterinarians. ... [I]t was stated by the veterinarian that the test results were inconclusive for anti-freeze [ethylene glycol] poising. ... The veterinarian indicated that the horse had toxicity of the liver, which he felt was not related to [ethylene glycol] poisoning.

One resident in Amwell Township was riding her horse behind the company's pond for holding fracking chemical flowback when she noticed "a hissing and bubbling sound in the stream" and a "red foamy oil slick" that caused the stream to exhibit "rainbow water". Range maintained that it was likely caused by "decayed vegetation that gave off gas", having attributed previous complaints of malodor to harmless anaerobic bacteria that grew near its fluid compressor stations. However chemical tests of the area later "revealed the presence of acetone, toluene, benzene, phenol, arsenic, barium, heavy metals and methane". The company then paid to have a water well drilled for the landowner, which the owner said also was contaminated.

According to a letter dated October 19, 2011, The Pennsylvania Department of Environmental Protection tested the landowner's well water twice, and found no contamination in the water.

The company paid $219,875 in fines to the Commonwealth of Pennsylvania as of May 2010. The bulk was $141,175 levied for a fracking fluid spill that killed aquatic life in Brush Creek in Washington County, Pennsylvania, which is protected by the state as a "high-quality waterway" according to the Pittsburgh Business Times. However, Ray Walker, vice president, said that the company has "made a lot of adjustments since then". The fluid spill was due to a "faulty elbow pipe"; according to Walker, Range has since "gone to a completely different pipe manufacturer and a completely different pipe design". Termination of employment and procedure changes also followed the incident.

In September 2014, the company was ordered to pay a $4.15 million penalty to settle violations related to 6 Marcellus Shale gas drilling and fracking wastewater impoundments in Washington County that contaminated soil and groundwater.

=== Contamination of water in Parker County, Texas ===
In 2010, the United States Environmental Protection Agency (EPA) issued an emergency order against the company, stating that the company's drilling activities in Parker County, Texas had led to the contamination of at least two residential drinking water wells. The company denied the allegations, and said the presence of methane was a result of naturally occurring migration, and had shown up in nearby water wells long before it drilled its gas wells. The EPA said that natural gas drilling by the company has contributed to the contamination of at least 2 residential drinking water wells in the county and ordered it to step in immediately. "Based on our findings to date, it's very clear that our activities have not had any impact on the water aquifer in southern Parker county or the subject water wells," the company said in a statement. The company said its investigations revealed that methane in the aquifer existed long before its drilling and likely is a naturally occurring migration from several shallow gas zones immediately below the water aquifer.

However, after a hearing in 2011, Texas Railroad Commission staff concluded that, based on chemical composition, the gas in the water wells came from the shallow Strawn Formation, rather than the deeper Barnett Shale, in which the company's wells were completed. They also concluded that pressure tests by Range showed mechanical integrity of the casing. EPA and the two homeowners were invited to present evidence at the hearing, but did not.

In March 2012, the EPA dropped its order against the company. The company said the move could help its $4.2 million defamation lawsuit against a Parker County couple who alleged in a $6.5 million lawsuit that Range contaminated their drinking water.

In December 2013, the federal Office of the Inspector General, addressing complaints by six US senators, issued a report concluding that the EPA had been justified in issuing its 2010 emergency order, and had acted reasonably in withdrawing the order after the company had agreed to groundwater quality monitoring.

== Public relations campaigns ==
=== Public relations campaign regarding zoning ===
The company has sponsored public relations campaigns supporting permitted use zoning regulations rather than conditional use zoning, which would provide for case-by-case hearings for citizen review of Range's drilling near their land or neighborhoods. According to NPR: "Mount Pleasant and its three citizen supervisors were ridiculously outmanned...in [an ensuing] full-scale PR war" with Range Resources when the supervisors decided to follow conditional use zoning policy used in other states such as Texas, Colorado and Wyoming. Through letters to lessors, Range wrote that it might stop drilling in the township if the township enacted conditional use zoning. Other townships that enacted conditional use zoning have been sued by Range Resources.

=== Use of former military personnel to deal with opposition ===
On November 8, 2011, at a conference, a company spokesman said that Range had "several former psy ops folks...[who are] very comfortable in dealing with localized issues and local governments", showing the extent to which the company was dealing with local opposition.

=== Public relations campaign regarding benefits of drilling to landowners ===
In 2011, as part of an effort to reassure the public of its activities, the company started a campaign, "My Range Resources" which depict "ordinary people... who have benefited from allowing drilling on their land". The ad campaign includes, in the words of journalist Bob Myers, "real Pennsylvanians talking earnestly about the wonderful experiences they've had with Range Resources". According to Elwin Green of the Pittsburgh Post-Gazette, Range Resources stands out because most gas companies generally prefer to keep a low profile, preferring to "tout their successes to Wall Street, but not to Main Street". In contrast, the company's campaign uses testimonials such as, "Natural gas has been ... a godsend to this area," from farmers or "In the last two years, probably 60 percent of our business is natural gas," from local business owners. Vice president Ray Walker was quoted as saying, "A lot of people don't know much about our industry or about Range Resources...we're committed to being the very best that we can be. We want to be accountable, transparent and accessible to people." Videos produced by public relations firms Big Picture Communications and Downtown's Animal Inc. used "unscripted video and purposely avoided using company spokespeople". Blake Lewis, CEO of Lewis Public Relations in Dallas and a board member of the Public Relations Society of America gave the company's website "high marks". However, journalists' reactions have been skeptical or mixed. According to Myers, "a quick review of the state Department of Environmental Protection records suggests that the truth is more complicated than the ads suggest...the folks at Range define good stewardship in a slightly different manner than is customary." Reg Henry of the Pittsburgh Post-Gazette thought "the whole promotion was skin crawling... but now I read MyRangeResources and I think: How cute is that for a gas drilling company? It makes me think of my daughter's My Little Pony when she was a mite".

== Legal issues ==
=== Property damage in Pennsylvania ===
In 2011, the company reached a $750,000 settlement with members of a Pennsylvania family that alleged their 10-acre farm had been destroyed by oil and gas development. Between 2011 and 2013, the Pittsburgh Post-Gazette sought to obtain court records related to the case. When a judge ordered records unsealed, the settlement agreement was initially not included in the 900 pages of records released. The agreement itself was released after the Pittsburgh Post-Gazette and the Observer–Reporter sued to gain access. As part of the settlement, the family members agreed to a gag order preventing them from talking about hydraulic fracking for the rest of their lives. The gag order covered not just the adults, but also the children, then aged seven and ten years old.

Although the court transcript records an attorney for the company saying that the order applies to the children and that the company "would certainly enforce it", the general counsel of the company said otherwise after court records were unsealed. In a 2013 letter to the Hallowich's attorney that was also released to the media, the general counsel for the company said. "Range has never, at any time, had the intention of seeking to hold a minor child legally accountable for a breach of that provision of the settlement agreement." The lawyer for the Hallowich family said Range had waived the confidentiality of the agreement by releasing the letter to a cable network, and that the family would seek judicial remedy.

=== Royalty under-payments ===
In March 2011, the company settled a class-action lawsuit alleging that royalty payments to Pennsylvania landowners had been improperly reduced. The company paid $1.75 million and agreed to $20 million of changes in its program.

In 2013, the company settled for $87.5 million a class-action lawsuit alleging royalty underpayments on sales of natural gas in Oklahoma.
