= Novaculite =

Type of rock

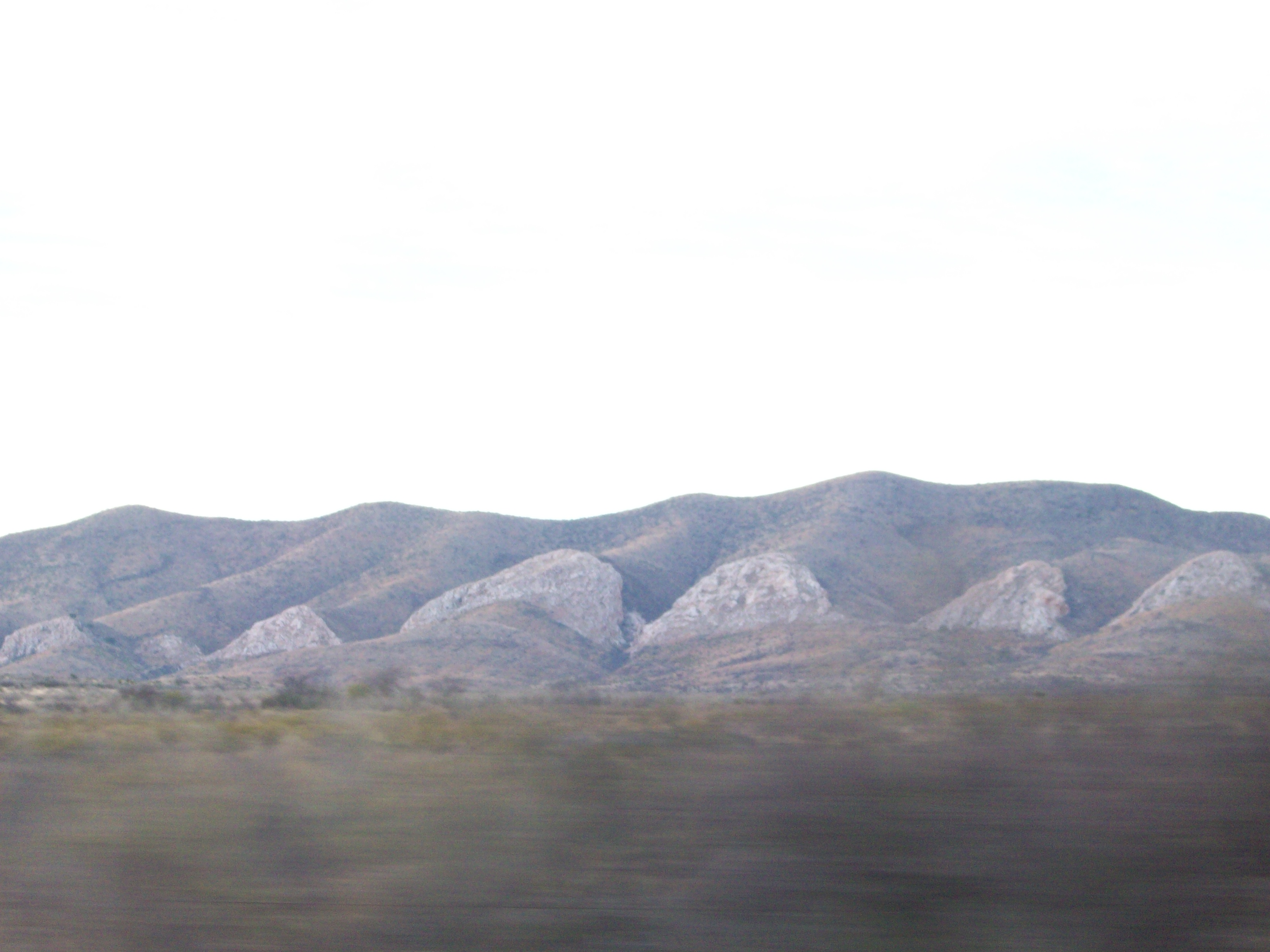
Novaculite forms light grey flatirons in the Marathon Uplift area of Texas.

Novaculite, also called Arkansas Stone, is a microcrystalline to cryptocrystalline rock type that consists of silica in the form of chert or flint. It is commonly white to grey or black in color, with a specific gravity that ranges from 2.2 to 2.5. It is used in the production of sharpening stones. It occurs in parts of Arkansas, Oklahoma, and Texas, as well as in Japan and parts of the Middle East. The name novaculite is derived from the Latin word novacula, meaning a sharp knife, dagger, or razor, in reference to its use in sharpening.

== Occurrence ==
Novaculite beds are present in the Ouachita Mountains of Arkansas and Oklahoma, and in the Marathon Uplift and Solitario regions of Texas. Novaculite is very resistant to erosion and the beds stand out as ridges in the Ouachita Mountains. There are also occurrences in Japan, Syria, Lebanon, and Israel.

== Origin ==
The novaculite beds of the south-central United States were deposited in the Ouachita Geosyncline, a deep-water marine trough, during Silurian to early Mississippian time. Sedimentation consisted primarily of siliceous skeletal particles of marine organisms such as sponge spicules and radiolaria, and very fine-grained, wind-blown quartz particles; there was very little argillaceous sedimentation during novaculite deposition. The novaculite beds were later subjected to folding and uplift, and probably low-grade metamorphism, during the Ouachita orogeny in early Pennsylvanian time.

== Use ==
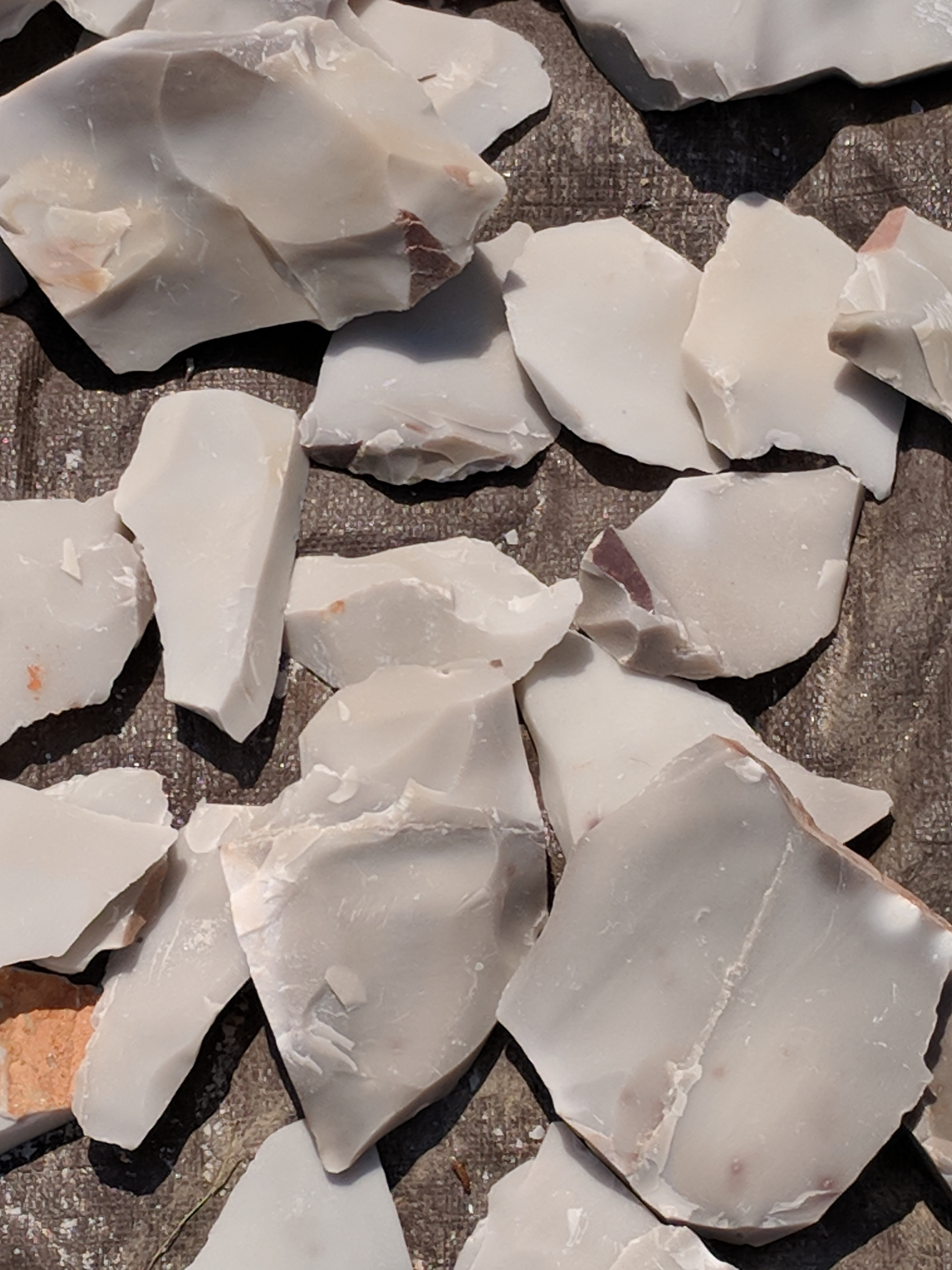
Novaculite spalls (flakes) from knapping.

Because novaculite is very hard and dense, it has been mined since prehistoric times, first for use as arrow and spear points, and later to make sharpening stones. Novaculite-rich sharpening stones from Arkansas are called Arkansas stones; stones produced in the Ottoman Empire (Syria, Lebanon, and Israel) were called Turkey stones; and novaculite stones were also produced in Japan. The crystal grains of novaculite measure 3 to 5 microns, equivalent to a US grit size of 600-1200, making novaculite suitable for the final stages of metal blade sharpening. Novaculite sharpening stones are classified by density.

The weathered upper strata of Arkansas novaculite, known as tripoli or "rotten stone", are rich in silica and have found a niche market as a performance additive or filler in the coatings, adhesives, sealants, and elastomer industries. Tripoli is mined just east of Hot Springs, Arkansas by the Malvern Minerals Company.
