= Permian Basin (North America) =

Large sedimentary basin in the US

- Location within the United States

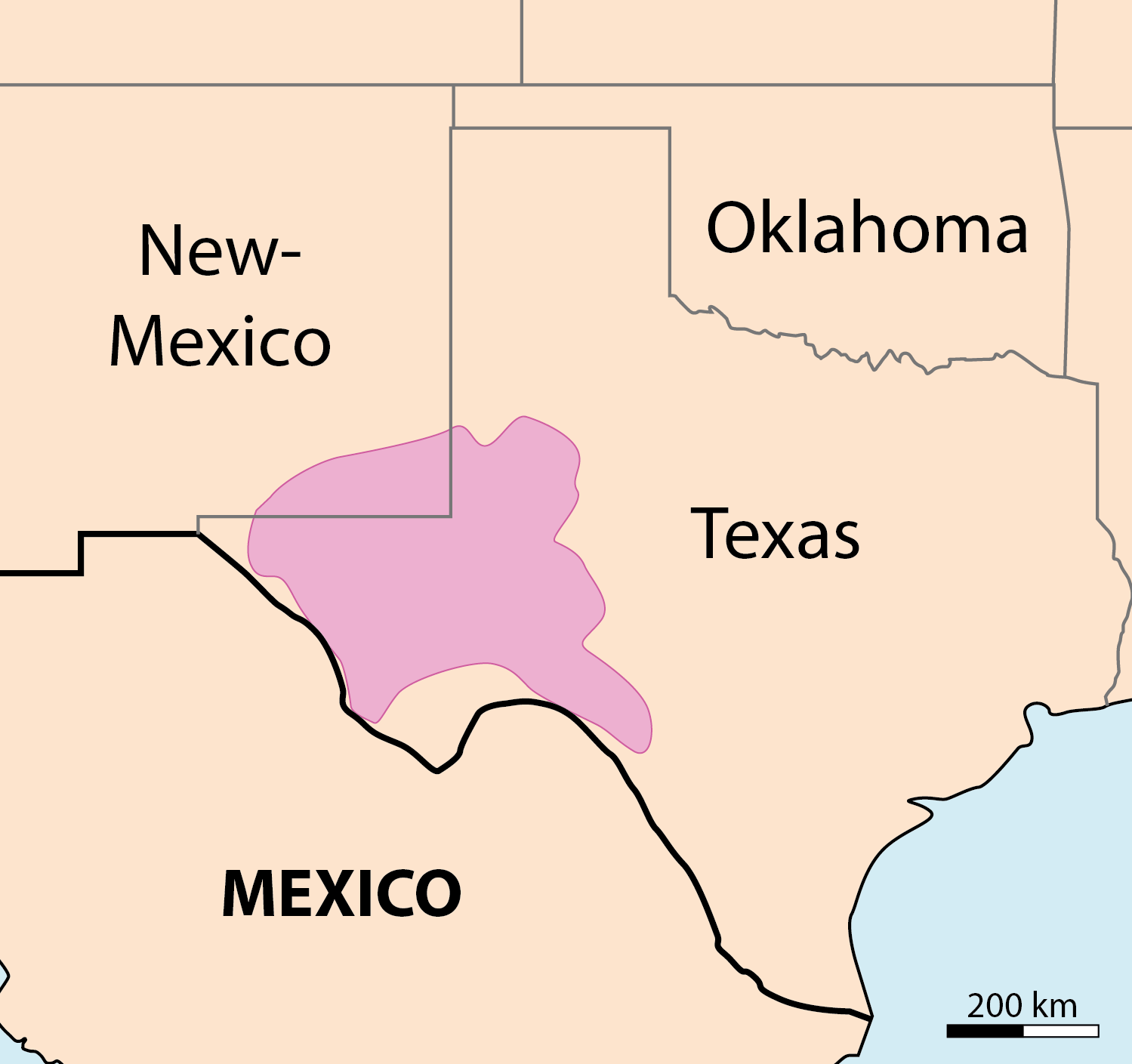
- The West Texas Permian Basin
- Coordinates: 32°30′N 103°00′W
- Etymology: Permian
- Location: Southwestern North America
- Country: United States
- States: Texas & New Mexico
- Cities: Midland, Odessa

Characteristics
- On/Offshore: Onshore
- Boundaries: Matador Arch (N); Ouachita–Marathon thrust belt (S)
- Area: >86,000 mi^{2} (220,000 km^{2})

Hydrology
- River: Pecos River

Geology
- Basin type: Cratonic basin (Bally & Snelson); Interior sag basin (Kingston et al.); Intracontinental complex basin (Klemme)
- Orogeny: Hercynian
- Age: Pennsylvanian–Guadalupian
- Stratigraphy: Stratigraphy
- Field: Fields

The Permian Basin is a large sedimentary basin in the southwestern part of the United States. It is the highest-producing oil field in the US, averaging 4.2 million barrels of crude oil per day in 2019. This sedimentary basin is located in western Texas and far-southeastern New Mexico.

It is named after the Permian geologic period, the final period of the Paleozoic era, as it contains some of the world's thickest deposits of rocks from the period.

The Permian Basin comprises several component basins, including the Midland Basin, the largest; the Delaware Basin, the second-largest; and the Marfa Basin, the smallest. The Permian Basin covers more than 86,000 square miles (220,000 km^{2}), and extends about 250 miles (400 km) wide and 300 miles (480 km) long.

The Texas cities of Midland, Odessa, and San Angelo serve as headquarters for some of the oil production activities in the basin.

The Permian Basin is also a major source of potassium salts (potash). Potash mines are located in Lea and Eddy counties, New Mexico, and are operated by the room and pillar method. Halite (rock salt) is produced as a byproduct of potash mining.

== Components ==
=== Delaware Basin ===
Figure 2

The Delaware Basin is the larger of the two major lobes of the Permian Basin within the foreland of the Ouachita–Marathon thrust belt separated by the Central Basin Platform. The basin contains sediment dating to Pennsylvanian, Wolfcampian (Neal Ranch and Lenox Hills Formations), Leonardian (Avalon Shale), and early Guadalupian times.

The eastward-dipping Delaware basin is subdivided into several formations (figure 2) and contains about 25,000 feet (7,600 m) of laminated siltstone and sandstone. Aside from clastic sediment, the Delaware basin also contains carbonate deposits of the Delaware Mountain Group, originating from the Guadalupian times when the Hovey Channel allowed access from the sea into the basin.

=== Midland Basin ===
Figure 4

The westward-dipping Midland Basin is subdivided into several formations (figure 4) and is composed of laminated siltstone and sandstone. The Midland Basin was filled by a large subaqueous delta that deposited clastic sediment into the basin. Aside from clastic sediment, the Midland Basin also contains carbonate deposits originating from the Guadalupian times when the Hovey Channel allowed access from the sea into the basin.

=== Central Basin Platform ===
Figure 6

The Central Basin Platform (CBP) is a tectonically uplifted basement block capped by a carbonate platform. The CBP separates the Delaware and Midland Basins and is subdivided into several formations, from oldest to youngest Neal Ranch, Lennox Hills, Abo, Yeso, Glorieta, San Andres, Grayburg, Queen, Seven Rivers, Yates, and Tansill Formations (Figure 5). The sequence mainly comprises carbonate reef deposits and shallow marine clastic sediments.

=== Eastern and Northwest Shelves ===
The Eastern and Northwestern Shelves are composed of shelf edge reefs and shelf carbonates flanking the Delaware and Midland Basins that grade up-dip into siltstones and evaporites. The Eastern and Northwestern Shelves are subdivided into the San Andres, Grayburg, Queen, Seven Rivers, Yates, and Tansill Formations.

=== San Simon Channel ===
The San Simon Channel is a narrow syncline that separated the Central Basin Platform from the Northwestern Shelf during Leonardian and Guadalupian times.

=== Sheffield Channel ===
The Sheffield Channel separates the southern margin of the Midland Basin from the southern shelf and the Ouachita–Marathon thrust-belt during Leonardian and Guadalupian times.

=== Hovey Channel ===
The Hovey Channel is a topographical low located on the southern edge of the Delaware Basin, allowing access to the Panthalassa sea during Guadalupian times. The Hovey Channel was originally an anticline which formed during Precambrian faulting, and was the main source of sea water for the Delaware Basin. The closing of the Hovey Channel towards the end of the Permian Period eventually caused the death of the Permian Reef, as without water being brought in through the Channel, salinity levels rose drastically in the Delaware Basin and the reef could not survive.

=== Horseshoe Atoll ===
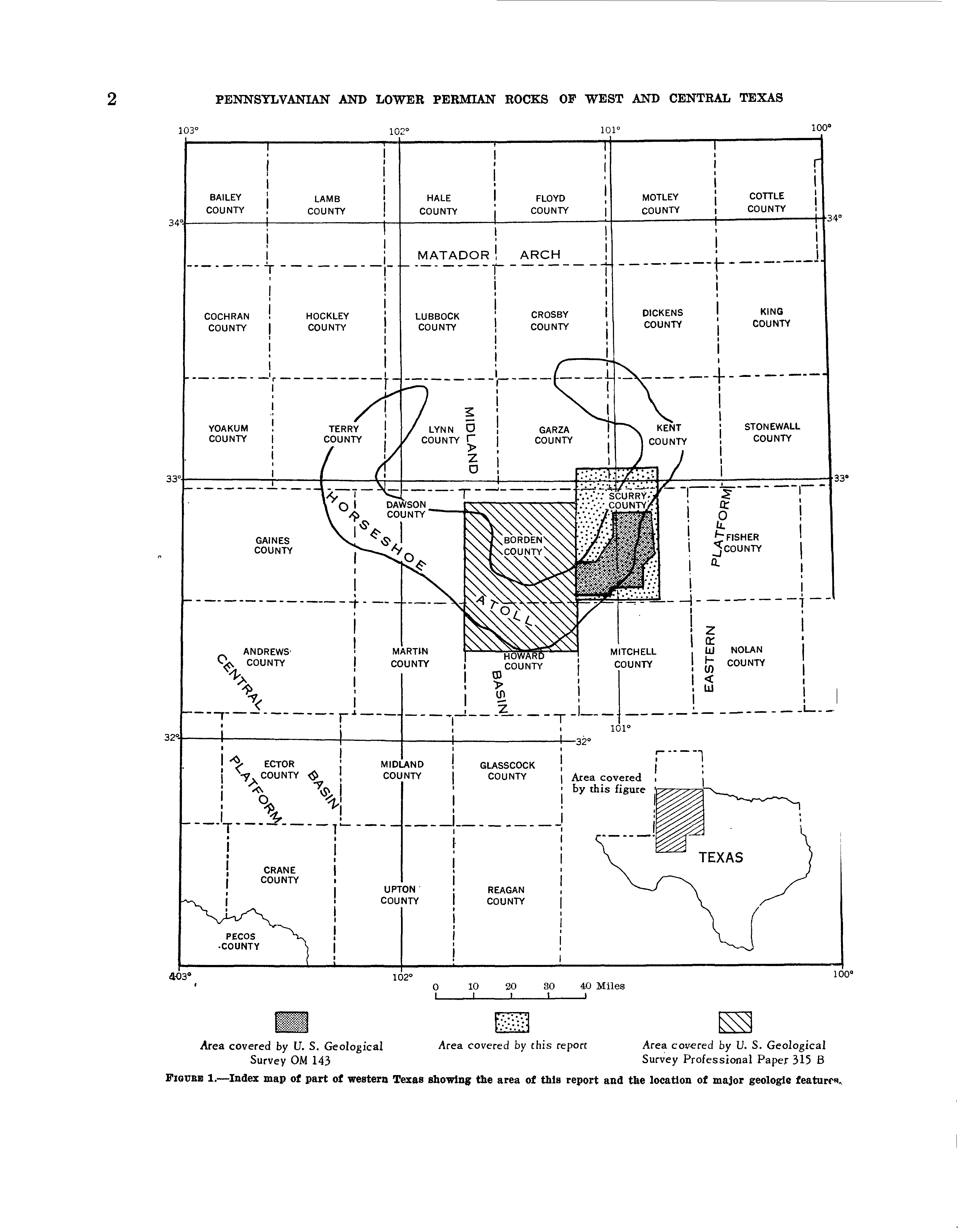
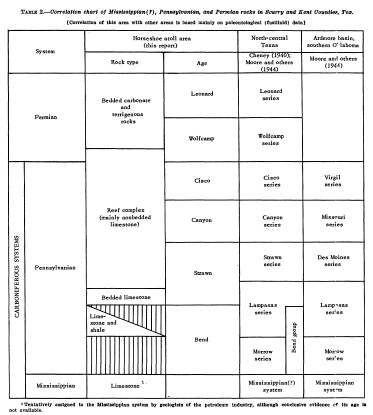
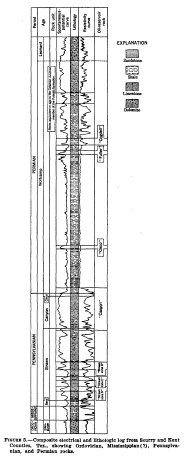
Horseshoe Atoll location, stratigraphic column, and well log

The Horseshoe Atoll is a westward-tilting arcuate chain of reef mounds 175 miles (282 km) long located in the Midland Basin, consisting of 1,804 feet (550 m) of limestone accumulated in the Pennsylvanian and 1,099 feet (335 m) in the Permian, with 15 significant petroleum reservoirs from 6,099 feet (1,859 m) to 9,902 feet (3,018 m) in depth.

The reef complex consists of Upper Pennsylvanian Strawn, Canyon and Cisco limestones, overlain by Lower Permian Wolfcamp sandstones and shales of terrigenous origin prograding northeast to southwest. The first production well, Seabird Oil Company of Delaware No. 1-B J. C. Caldwell, was completed in 1948.

== Depositional history ==
The Permian Basin is the thickest deposit of Permian-aged rocks on Earth; they were rapidly deposited during the collision of North America and Gondwana (South America and Africa) between the late Mississippian through the Permian. The Permian Basin also includes formations that date back to the Ordovician Period, 445 million years ago (mya).

=== Proterozoic ===
Before the breakup of the Precambrian supercontinent and the formation of the modern Permian Basin geometry, shallow marine sedimentation onto the ancestral Tobosa Basin characterized the passive margin, shallow marine environment. The Tobosa Basin also contains basement rock that dates back to 1,330 million years ago (mya), and that is still visible in the present-day Guadalupe Mountains. The basement rock contains biotite-quartz granite, discovered at a depth of 12,621 feet (3,847 m).

In the nearby Apache and Glass Mountains, the basement rock is made of metamorphosed sandstone and Precambrian-aged granite. The entire area is also underlain by layered mafic rocks, which are thought to be a part of Pecos Mafic Igneous Suite, and extends 220 miles (360 km) into the southern US. It has been dated to 1,163 mya.

=== Early to mid-Paleozoic (Late Cambrian to Mississippian) ===
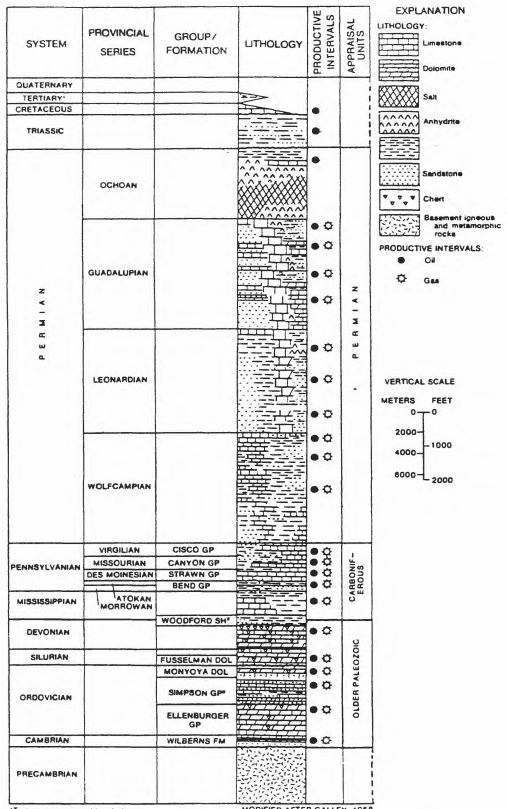
Permian Basin stratigraphic column

==== Ordovician Period (485.4–443.8 mya) ====
Each period from the Paleozoic Era has contributed a specific lithology to the Tobosa Basin, accumulating into almost 6,600 feet (2,000 m) of sediment at the start of the Pennsylvanian Period (323.2–298.9 mya). The Montoya Group is the youngest rock formation in the Tobosa Basin and was formed in the Ordovician Period (485.4–443.8 mya), and sit directly on the igneous and metamorphic basement rocks.

The rocks from the Montoya Group are described as light to medium grey, fine to medium grained crystalline calcareous dolomite. These rocks were sometimes inter-bedded with shale, dark-grey limestone, and, less commonly, chert. the Montoya Group sequence is made up of carbonate limestone and dolomite which is described as dense, impermeable, and non-porous, and is more commonly found in the Glass Mountains outcrop, with thickness varying from 151 to 509 feet (46 to 155 m).

==== Silurian Period (443.8–419.2 mya) ====
During the Silurian Period, the Tobosa Basin experienced dramatic changes in sea level which led to the formation of multiple rock groups. The first of these groups, called the Fusselman Formation, is mostly made up of light grey, medium to coarse grained dolomite. The thickness of this formation varies from 49 to 164 feet (15 to 50 m), and parts of the Fusselman Formation were also subject to karstification, which indicates a drop in sea level.

The second rock group that formed during the Silurian Period is called the Wristen Formation, which is mud, shale, and dolomite rich rock that reaches a thickness of 1,480 feet (450 m) in some places. Karstification of the Fusselman Formation shows that a drop in sea level occurred, but sea levels rose again during a transgressive event, which lead to the creation of the Wristen Formation. Sea levels then dropped again, which led to major exposure, erosion, and karstification of these formations.

==== Devonian Period (419.2–358.9 mya) ====
The Thirtyone Formation was developed during the Devonian Period. This formation is characterized by its limestone, chert, and shale beds, some of which had a peak thickness of 980 feet (300 m). this formation had many different types of limestone, including light-colored siliceous, chert-dominated, crinoid-rich, and sandy limestone. The Thirtyone Formation is very similar to the formation of the Mississippian Period, which is likely because there was little to no change in the environment during this time.

==== Mississippian Period (358.9–323.2 mya) ====
The Mississippian Limestone is the main formation to develop during this Period. This formation, similar to the previously mentioned Thirtyone Formation, is composed primarily of limestone and shale. The limestone beds are described as being "brown to dark brown, micro-crystalline to very finely crystalline, commonly sandy, and dolomitic", while the shale beds are "grey to black, hard, platy, pyritic, organic, and very siliceous". The Mississippian Limestone ranges from 49 to 171 feet (15 to 52 m) in thickness, while generally being thinner towards the southern part of the Tobosa Basin.

The Barnett Shale is the second formation to have developed during the Mississippian Period. It consists mainly of silty brown shale and fine-grained sandstone and siltstone. This Formation was much thicker than the Mississippian Limestone, ranging from 200 to 460 feet (60 to 140 m). The increased thickness can be explained by increased sedimentation in the area, which was likely caused by tectonic activity in the region.

===== Tectonic Activity During the Mississippian Period =====
The Ouachita Orogeny occurred during the Late Mississippian, leading to tectonic activity in the region. The subsequent folding and faulting caused by this Orogeny led to the Tobosa Basin being divided into three sections: the Delaware Basin, the Midland Basin, and the Central Basin Platform. The end of the Mississippian Period also led to the beginning of the formation of the modern Permian Reef Complex. The legacy of the early to mid-Paleozoic is almost 6,600 feet (2,000 m) of sediments that were accumulated due to almost uninterrupted sedimentation.

=== Late Paleozoic (Pennsylvanian to Permian) ===
==== Pennsylvanian Period (323.2–298.9 mya) ====
The Pennsylvanian Period marked the beginning of geological processes that would shape the Permian Basin into what we see today. Rifting events during the Cambrian Period (early Paleozoic) left fault zones in the region. These fault zones acted as planes of weakness for faulting that was later initiated by the Ouachita Orogeny.

These fault zones, due to tectonic activity, transformed the Tobosa Basin into the Permian Reef Complex, comprising three parts: the Central Basin Platform, encircled by faults, and the Midland and Delaware Basins on either side. Mississippian sediments are absent either due to erosion or nondeposition. Marine shales were deposited in the center of the Delaware, Midland and Val Verde basins, while the basins' periphery saw the deposition of shallow marine, carbonate shelf and limestone sediments.

===== The Morrow Formation =====
The Early Pennsylvanian Morrow Formation underlies the Atoka Formation. The Morrow is an important reservoir consisting of clastic sediments, sandstones and shales, deposited in a deltaic environment.

===== Other formations =====
The Pennsylvanian Period also led to the development of other geologic formations, although none were as important as the Morrow Formation. The Atoka Formation lies conformably on top of the Morrow Formation, and is characterized by its fossil-rich limestone interbedded with shale, reaching a maximum thickness of 660 feet (200 m). During the formation of the Atoka, uplift was still occurring in the region, leading to increased sedimentation as the surrounding highlands were eroded. The increased sedimentation led to the formation of medium- to coarse-grained sandstone. In the Atoka Formation, the first reef structures that formed in the Delaware Basin are visible.

The Strawn Formation formed after the Atoka, also during the Pennsylvanian Period, and reached a maximum thickness of 660 feet (200 m). In this formation, there was a significant increase in reef mounds. The Strawn Formation is primarily made up of massive limestone, along with "fine to medium-grained sandstone, dark to light-grey shale, and occasional reddish-brown, greenish-grey, bituminous shale". A great number of different fossil types were preserved in this formation, including brachiopods, foraminifera, bryozoans, corals, and crinoids.

The Pennsylvanian Period also includes two other formations, the Canyon and Cisco Formations, which are significant due to the major oil reservoirs discovered in them.

==== Permian Period (298.9–251 mya) ====
The Permian Period was a time of major reef building to transform the Permian Reef Complex into a major reef system, with Permian-aged rock formations making up 95% of the present-day outcrops in the Permian Basin. When considering any type of reef building that occurred in the Permian, it is important to keep in mind that tectonics played a major part. During this period, the supercontinent of Pangaea, which lasted from 335 to 175 mya, started undergoing breakup. Pangea was clustered together near the equator and surrounded by the superocean Panthalassa, with the Permian Basin located on its western edge within 5–10 degrees of the equator.

Any reef building environment would need a source of water, and the Delaware Basin was located near a marginal sea. Thanks to the Hovey Channel, this sea transported water into the Delaware Basin. Global temperatures during this time were warm, as the world climate was changing from icehouse to greenhouse. This rise in global temperatures also led to the melting of ice masses located towards the South Pole, which then led to a rise in sea levels.

The Permian Period has been split up into main epochs, each of which has separate subdivision. In each sub-epoch, a different formation was formed in the different parts of the Permian Reef Complex.

===== Cisuralian Epoch (298.9–272.3 mya) =====
Climatic zones of the Carboniferous–Permian boundary

The Cisuralian Epoch contained two ages, the Wolfcampian and the Leonardian, both of which have a geological formation in the Permian Basin named after them.

The Wolfcampian Formation lies conformably on top of the Pennsylvanian Formation and is the first formation from the Permian Period. Its composition varies depending on its location in the Basin, with the northernmost part being more rich in shale. The thickness of this formation also varies, reaching a maximum of 1,600 feet (500 m). The Wolfcampian is made up primarily of grey to brown shale and fine-grained, chert-dominated, brown limestone. There are also interbedded layers of fine-grained sandstone found within the formation.

The primary formation that remains from the Leonardian Age is called the Bone Spring Limestone, which reaches a max thickness of 2,000 feet (600 m) and lies directly below the Capitan Reef Complex. The Bone Spring limestone can be divided into two formations: the Victorio Peak Member, which consists of massive beds of limestone measuring up to 98 feet (30 m); and the Cutoff Shale Member, which is formed from black, platy, siliceous shale and shaley sandstone.

The Bone Spring Limestone consists of several fossils, such as bryozoans, crinoids, and spirifers, but lack algae and sponges that are plentiful in the rest of the Permian Reef Complex. Rocks from the Bone Spring Limestone are predominantly found in the Delaware Basin, but the Victorio Peak Member extends into the shelf margin area.

===== Guadalupian Epoch (272.3–259.8 mya) =====
The Guadalupian Epoch was named after the Guadalupe Mountains, since this epoch in the Permian is when reef building was at its most efficient. Lasting from approximately 272–260 mya, this epoch was dominated by the Delaware Mountain Group, which can be further subdivided into rock divisions based on location in the Permian Reef Complex.

====== Brushy Canyon Formation ======
The first formation that makes up the Delaware Mountain Group is the Brushy Canyon Formation, and it lies in the Delaware Basin. The Brushy Canyon Formation is made up of thin interbedded layers of alternating fine grained and massive quartz sandstone, as well as shaley brown to black sandstone. This formation reaches a maximum thickness of 1,150 feet (350 m) but thins out significantly as it approaches the basin margins due to transgressive onlap. The Brushy Canyon Formation also contains small reef patches, ripple marks, and crossed bedded strata, that indicate that the Delaware Basin had a shallow water environment at this time.

====== Cherry Canyon Formation ======
The next unit of the Delaware Mountain Group is the Cherry Canyon, which had multiple different sub-units and extended into the Delaware Basin and the surrounding shelf environments. The Cherry Canyon Formation can be subdivided into four sub-units, each of which will be discussed briefly.

====== Lower Gateway Formation ======
The Lower Getaway member is a limestone that has different characteristics based on its location in the Delaware Basin, and contains patch reefs close to the basin margin. These reefs are often found on limestone conglomerate and breccias. The Upper Getaway Member is more consistent and is characterised as a thick bedded dolomite which integrates into the San Andres Formation as it moves toward the shelf. The middle unit of the Cherry Canyon Formation is the South Wells Member, which is composed of sandstone and integrates itself into the Goat Seep Reef as it moves towards the basin shelf.

====== Manzanita Member ======
The upper unit is the Manzanita Member, which consists of dolomite, and gets pinched out underneath the Capitan Formation as it moves into the basin margins. All four members of the Cherry Canyon Formation have undergone dolomitization near the basin margins. This is evident since the calcite/aragonite bioclastic debris that existed as a part of this formation has been preserved as molds in dolomite. It has been suggested by some authors that the clasts and debris might have been dolomitic upon deposition, but that is improbable since the debris came from the reef, which was not dolomitic.

====== Bell Canyon Formation ======
The Bell Canyon Formation is the next unit in the Delaware Mountain Group, and it is the age equivalent unit to the Capitan Reef Formation which formed on the shelf. The Bell Canyon Formation consists of "un-fossiliferous, dark-grey to black, platy, fine-grained limestone". All the Cherry Canyon Formation and the bottom part of the Bell Canyon Formation have thin interbeds of dark-colored bioclastic limestone and fine-grained sandstone. As these formations move towards the basin margins, the sandstone wedges out and the limestone thickens into massive, meters thick beds, containing reef talus.

====== Goat Seep Reef Formation ======
The Goat Seep Reef Formation lies on the shelf margin and integrates with the Getaway Formation in the basin and the San Andres Formation towards the Shelf. This formation is described as 1,150 feet (350 m) thick, one mile (1,600 m) long, and made up entirely of massive dolomite. In the bottom half of the formation, the dolomite is stratified into massive beds. This formation also contains molds of organisms destroyed by the dolomitization process.

====== Reef building in the Guadalupian Epoch ======
The Guadalupian Epoch is one of the most successful in history in terms of reef building, since most Permian reefs reached their maximum in size, diversity, extent, and abundance during this Epoch, with the Capitan Reef being one of the most famous examples. In the Guadalupian, reefs were abundant globally, and grew in places such as the Delaware Basin, the Zechstein Basin in Eastern Europe, along the Tethys Ocean, and in cool water shelves in the Panthalassa Ocean.

The end of this golden age for reef building occurred due to the "end-Guadalupian reef crisis", which involved global drops in sea levels and regional salinity fluctuations. The movement and collision of microcontinents during the break up of Pangea also caused the destruction of many Guadalupian Reefs. Even with the number of reefs from that epoch that have been destroyed, there are over 100 Guadalupian reefs that remain in the world, the most from any Permian epoch.

===== Reef growth during the Late Permian =====
The growth of the Capitan Reef, which is referred to as a "massive member" due to it being formed from massive limestone, can be described in three stages. The first stage is the establishment of the reef and its rapid growth. Due to the slower rates of subsidence of this time, the reef was able to build itself up quickly. Once the reef reached sea level, it began to grow horizontally, since it could not grow vertically anymore. The reef environment during the first stage of development was described as warm (around 68 °F [20 °C]), shallow, high energy, clear water that was free from debris and which had a normal salinity level of 27 to 40 ppt (parts per thousand).

The basin water provided plenty of nutrients, since there was continuous upwelling of water that mixed newly brought marine water with anoxic water from the basin floor. The makeup of the reef is described as being built primarily from erect sponges, which have large, rigid skeletons, and abundant red algae, microbial micrite, and inorganic cement. The microbial micrite worked to trap sediment.

One of the most prominent sponges that made up the Capitan Reef was the sponge family Guadalupiidae, a sponge that first appeared on Glass Mountains in the mid-Permian and had spread into the Delaware Basin by the late Permian.

There were more environmental changes to mark the second stage of the formation of the Capitan Reef. This period of growth was marked by eustatic changes in global sea levels, due to frequent glaciations. The reef experienced major growth vertically at this stage and grew at a rapid enough pace to keep up with rising sea levels. The Capitan Reef also found a stable foundation on the reef debris and talus that rested on its slopes, and this foundation allowed the reef to grow outward. In some locations, nutrients and minerals were so abundant that the Capitan Reef grew out almost 50 km from the starting point.

===== Reef death during the Late Permian =====
The third stage of the Capitan Reef is the death of the reef system. Ocean currents in the Permian played a huge role in setting up the climate of the region and for aiding in the growth and death of the Capitan Reef. The climate of the basin region was hot and arid, which is shown in the evaporite deposits that can be found in the back reef region.

The end in growth and accumulation of the Permian Reef Complex was influenced by tectonics. During the end of the Permian Period, the supercontinent of Pangaea was beginning its break up, which drastically changed the conditions that were previously favourable for reef growth. Change in tectonics limited the exchange of sea water in the Hovey Channel, which then led to a salinity increase in the Permian Basin. The reef could not survive this drastic change in water salinity, and was therefore destroyed.

Up until the Guadalupian, the Permian Basin had adequate water circulation with fresh water coming in from the Hovey Channel. Evaporite growth along the bottom portions of the basin showed that the water column was most likely stratified and euxinic, meaning the water was both anoxic and sulfidic. The passageways between the Delaware and Midland Basins were restricted due to tectonic changes, and this caused the salinity of the water to rise. The growing temperatures in the late Permian combined with the increase in salinity caused the extinction of the Capitan Reef, as well as the formation of evaporites with the basin.

The layers of evaporites that formed as a result of increased salinity is called the Castile Formation. This formation consists of alternating layers of gypsum/anhydrite and limestone, as well as massive beds of gypsum/anhydrite, salt, and some limestone. The unit measures almost 4,300 feet (1,300 m) in total and was formed during the Lopingian Epoch. The individual layers (laminae) of gypsum/anhydrite are between 0.039 inches (1 mm) and 3.9 inches (10 cm) in thickness, which is thought to correlate with the basin salinity on a year-by-year basis.

The Capitan Reef had been altered diagenetically early on in its history, especially after the deposition of the Castile Formation. There is evidence of fabric alteration throughout this formation, which is thought to indicate the dehydration and rehydration process of the gypsum and anhydrites. There is also evidence of evaporite calcitization. The reef system was buried until it was exposed in the Mesozoic era as a result of tectonic activity by the Laramide orogeny. The deep water shale and carbonate reefs of the Delaware and Midland Basins and the Central Basin Platform would become lucrative hydrocarbon reservoirs.

== Generalized facies tracts of the Permian Basin ==
The Permian basin is divided into generalized facies belts differentiated by the depositional environment in which they formed, influenced by sea level, climate, salinity, and access to the sea.

=== Lowstand systems tract ===
Lowering sea level exposes the peritidal and potentially, the shelf margin regions, allowing linear channel sandstones to cut into the shelf, extending beyond the shelf margin atop the slope carbonates, fanning outward toward the basin. The tidal flats during a lowstand contain aeolian sandstones and siltstones atop supratidal lithofacies of the transgressive systems tract. The basin fill during a lowstand is composed of thin carbonate beds intermingled with sandstone and siltstone at the shelf and sandstone beds within the basin.

=== Transgressive systems tract ===
These facies results from the abrupt deepening of the basin and the reestablishment of carbonate production. Carbonates such as bioturbated wackstone and oxygen-poor lime mud accumulate atop the underlying lowstand systems tract sandstones in the basin and on the slope. The tidal flats are characterized by supratidal faces of hot and arid climate such as dolomudstones and dolopackstones. The basin is characterized by thick carbonate beds on or close to the shelf with the shelf margin becoming progressively steeper and the basin sandstones becoming thinner.

=== Highstand systems tract ===
Highstand systems tract facies results from the slowing down in the rise of sea level. It is characterized by carbonate production on the shelf margin and dominant carbonate deposition throughout the basin. The lithofacies is of thick beds of carbonates on the shelf and shelf margin and thin sandstone beds on the slope. The basin becomes restricted by the formation of red beds on the shelf, creating evaporites in the basin.

== Tectonic history ==
During the Cambrian–Mississippian, the ancestral Permian Basin was the broad marine passive margin Tobosa Basin containing deposits of carbonates and clastics. In the early Pennsylvanian–early Permian the collision of North American and Gondwana Land (South America and Africa) caused the Hercynian orogeny. The Hercynian orogeny resulted in the Tobosa basin being differentiated into two deep basins (the Delaware and the Midland Basins) surrounded by shallow shelves. During the Permian, the basin became structurally stable and filled with clastics in the basin and carbonates on the shelves.

=== Lower Paleozoic passive margin phase (late Precambrian–Mississippian, 850–310 mya) ===
This passive margin succession is present throughout the southwestern US and is up to 0.93 miles (1.5 km) thick. The ancestral Permian basin is characterized by weak crustal extension and low subsidence in which the Tobosa basin developed. The Tobosa basin contained shelf carbonates and shales.

=== Collision phase (late Mississippian–Pennsylvanian, 310–265 mya) ===
The two lobed geometry of the Permian basin separated by a platform was the result of the Hercynian collisional orogeny during the collision of North America and Gondwana Land (South America and Africa). This collision uplifted the Ouachita-Marathon fold belt and deformed the Tobosa Basin. The Delaware Basin resulted from tilting along areas of Proterozoic weakness in Tobosa basin. Southwestern compression reactivated steeply dipping thrust faults and uplifted the Central Basin ridge. Folding of the basement terrane split the basin into the Delaware basin to the west and the Midland Basin to the east.

=== Permian Basin phase (Permian, 265–230 mya) ===
Rapid sedimentation of clastics, carbonate platforms and shelves, and evaporites proceeded synorogenically. Bursts of orogenic activity are divided by three angular unconformities in basin strata. Evaporite deposits in the small remnant basin mark the final stage of sedimentation as the basin became restricted from the sea during sea level fall.

== Hydrocarbon production and reserves ==
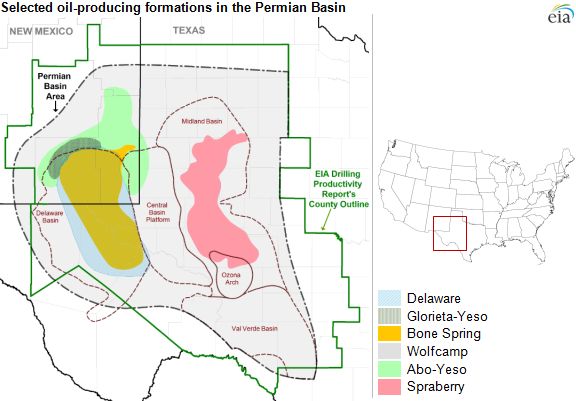
Figure 9: Significant hydrocarbon plays within the Permian Basin

The Permian Basin is the largest petroleum-producing basin in the United States and has produced a cumulative 28.9 billion barrels of oil and 75 trillion cubic feet of gas. In early 2020, over 4 million barrels of oil a day were being pumped from the basin. Eighty percent of estimated reserves are located at less than 10,000 feet (3,000 m) depth. Ten percent of the oil recovered from the Permian Basin has come from Pennsylvanian carbonates.

The largest reservoirs are within the Central Basin Platform, the Northwestern and Eastern shelves, and within Delaware Basin sandstones. The Primary lithologies of the major hydrocarbon reservoirs are limestone, dolomite, and sandstone due to their high porosities. However, advances in hydrocarbon recovery such as horizontal drilling and hydraulic fracturing have expanded production into unconventional, tight oil shales such as those found in the Wolfcamp Shale.

=== History of resources ===
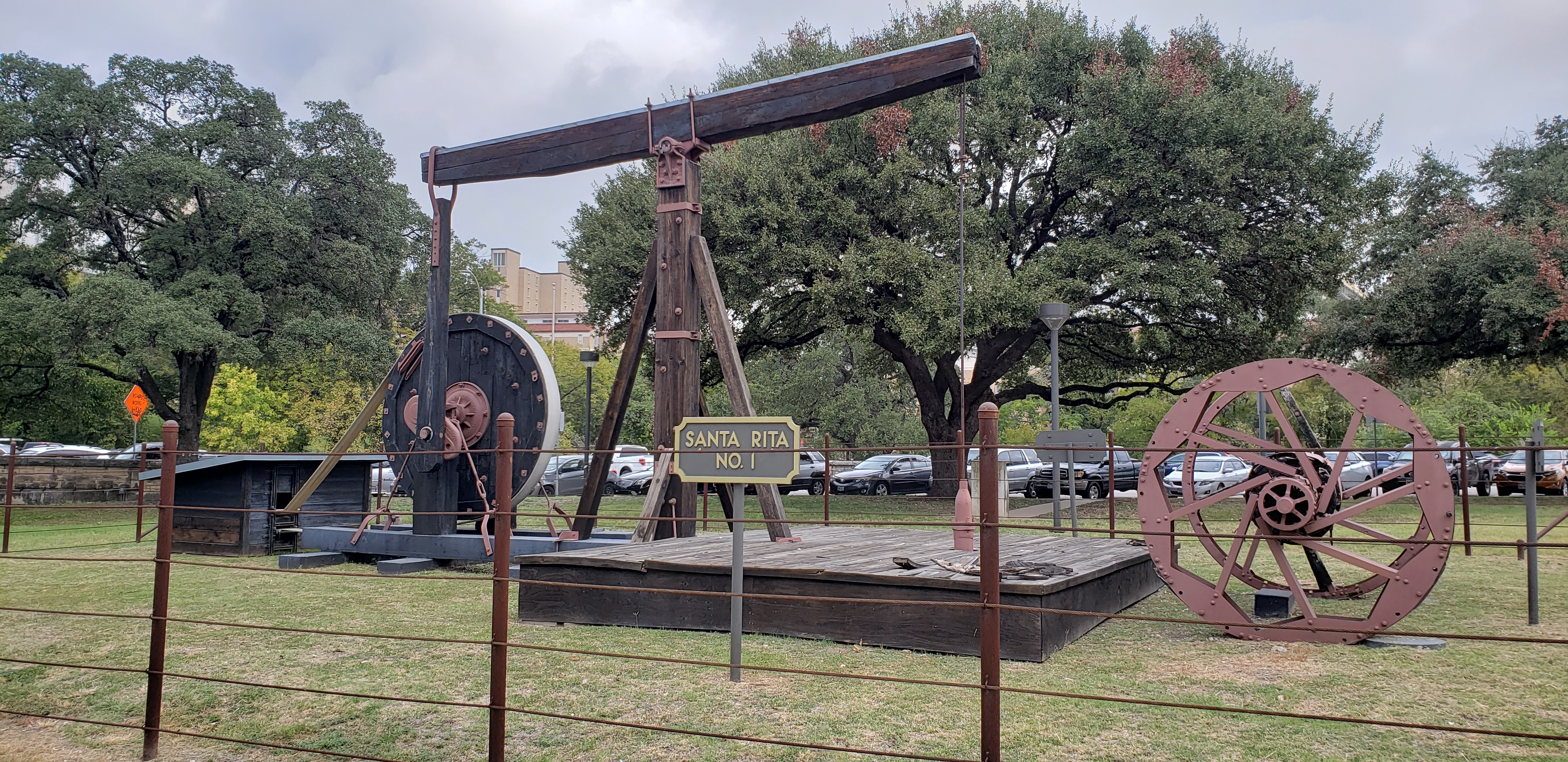
Santa Rita No. 1 rig, used in the discovery of the Big Lake Oil Field in 1923

In 1917, J.A. Udden, a University of Texas geology professor, speculated that the Marathon Fold, associated with the Marathon Mountains, may extend northward. This fold theory was further elaborated on in 1918 by geologists R.A. Liddle and J.W. Beede. The potential structure was thought to be a potential trap for oil. Based on this Marathon Fold theory, and known oil seeps, test drilling commenced in the eastern Permian Basin.

Oil reserves in the Permian Basin were first documented by W.H. Abrams in Mitchell County, West Texas in 1920. The first commercial well was opened in 1921, in the newly discovered Westbrook Oil Field in Mitchell County, at a depth of 2,498 feet (761 m). Initially, the Permian Basin was thought to have a bowl-like shape, with geological survey crews unable to study the inside of the basin due to a lack of outcrops.

The next few years contained discoveries of multiple oil fields, such as the Big Lake oil field (1923), the World oil field (1925), the McCamey oil field (1925), the Hendrick oil field (1926), and the Yates Oil Field (1926). All of these discoveries were made by random drilling or surfacing mapping. Geophysical tests were vital in mapping the region, since tools such as seismographs and magnetometers were used to find anomalies in the area.

By 1924, companies establishing regional geological offices in the basin included the California Company (Standard Oil of California), Gulf Oil, Humble (Standard Oil of New Jersey), Roxana (Shell Oil Company), Dixie Oil (Standard Oil of Indiana), Midwest Exploration (Standard Oil of Indiana), and The Texas Company.

Due to distances and lack of pipes in which to move oil, deep drilling tests were few in the 1920s, since the costs were high. As a result, all the oil wells up to 1928 were less than 5,000 feet (1,500 m) or 6,000 feet (1,800 m) deep. In 1928, the No. I-B University discovery well found oil at 8,520 feet within the Ordovician formations of Big Lake. Exploration and development increased in the 1930s with the discovery of the Harper oil field (1933), the Goldsmith oil field (1934), the Foster oil field (1935), the Keystone oil field (1935), the Means oil field (1934), the Wasson oil field (1936–1937), and the Slaughter Field (1936).

During World War II the need for oil in the US became urgent, justifying the high costs of deep oil drilling. This breakthrough led to major oil reservoirs being found in every geological formation from the Cambrian Period to the Permian Period. Significant discoveries included the Embrar oil field (1942), the TXL oil field (1944), the Dollarhide oil field (1945), and the Block 31 oil field (1945).

In 1966, the production of the Permian Basin measured 600 million barrels of oil, along with 2.3 trillion cubic feet of gas, which totaled $2 billion. The production values steadily increased thanks to the installation of gas pipelines and oil refineries in the area, reaching a total production of over 14.9 billion barrels in 1993.

In addition to oil, one of the main commodities that is mined from the Permian Basin is potash, which was first discovered in the region in the late 1800s by geologist Johan August Udden. Early studies by Udden, and the presence of potash in the Santa Rita well between 1,100 and 1,700 feet, led to the United States Geological Survey exploring the area in search of potash, which was highly important during World War I as the US could no longer import it from Germany. By the mid-1960s, seven potash mines were operating on the New Mexico side of the Permian Basin.

=== Current production ===
As of 2018, the Permian Basin has produced more than 33 billion barrels of oil, along with 118 trillion cubic feet of natural gas. This production accounts for 20% of US crude oil production and 7% of US dry natural gas production. While the production was thought to have peaked in the early 1970s, new technologies for oil extraction, such as hydraulic fracturing and horizontal drilling, have increased production dramatically. Estimates from the Energy Information Administration have predicted that proven reserves in the Permian Basin still hold 5 billion barrels of oil and approximately 19 trillion cubic feet of natural gas as of 2018.

=== Environmental concerns ===
By October 2019, the fossil-fuel executives said that until recently they had been making progress in cutting back on flaring, which is to burn natural gas. Drilling companies focus on drilling and pumping oil, which is highly lucrative, but the less-valuable gas which is pumped along with the oil is considered to be a "byproduct". During the current boom in the Permian oil fields, drilling for oil has "far outpaced pipeline construction" so the use of flaring has increased along with venting "natural gas and other potent greenhouse gases directly into the atmosphere", causing considerably larger greenhouse effect than flaring. Both practices are legal under states' legislation. The price of natural gas was so cheap that smaller companies that have the pipeline capacity are choosing to flare rather than pay pipeline costs.

==== Methane emissions ====
Methane Tracking in the Permian Basin using EMIT and AVIRIS-3

Most of the methane emitted comes from a small number of sources. Satellite data show that 3.7% of gas produced from the Permian Basin is lost in leaks, equivalent to the consumption of 7 million Texas homes. Drilling in the Permian Basin creates about 2.7 Mt a year of emissions, which is 35% of U.S. oil and gas production emissions.

The 2021 Carbon Mapper project, a collaboration of the Jet Propulsion Laboratory and academia, detected 533 methane super-emitters in the Permian Basin.

== Counties and municipalities of the Permian Basin ==
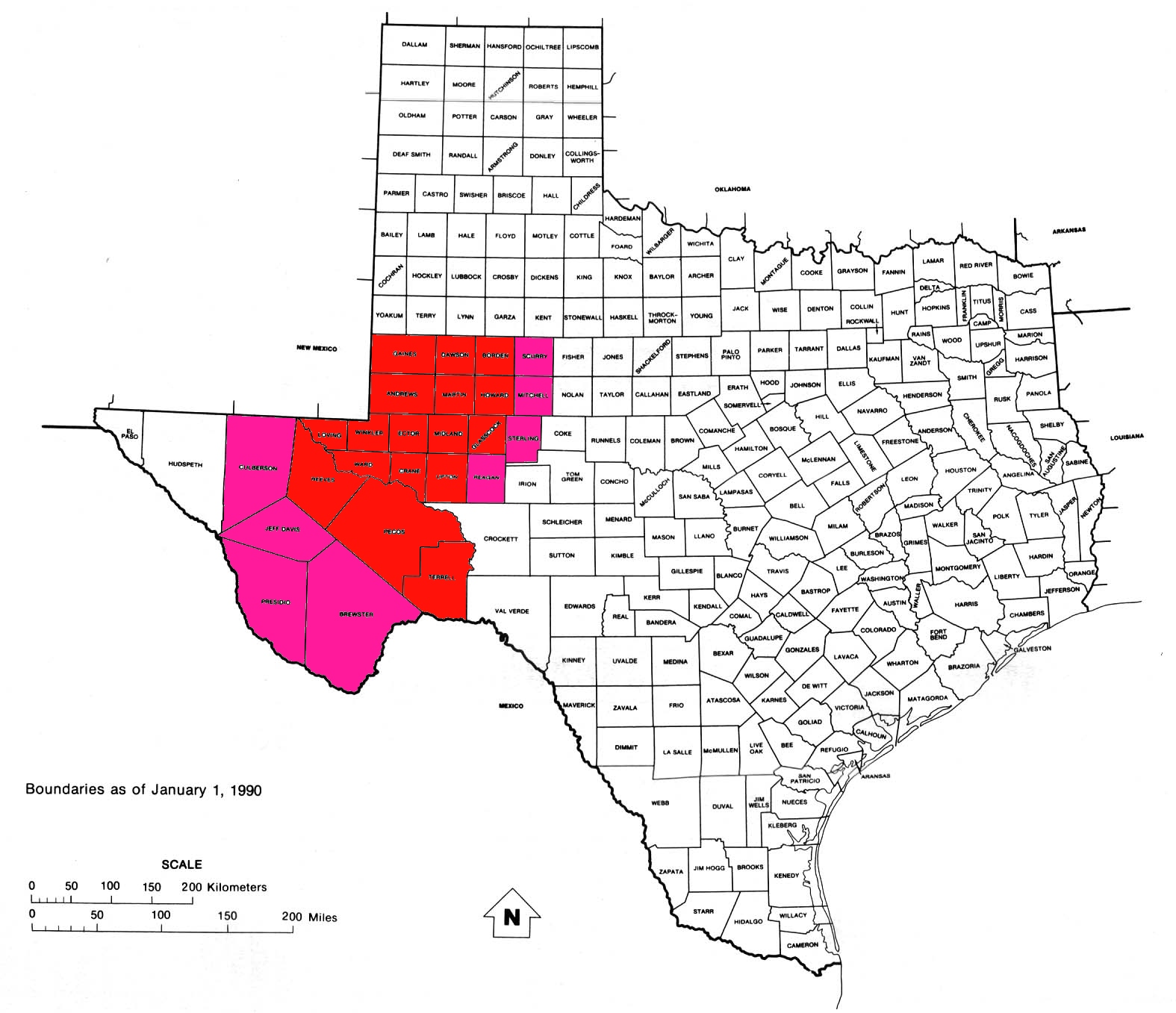
A map of the Permian Basin region in Texas. Red is the core. Pink represents the counties sometimes included in the region.

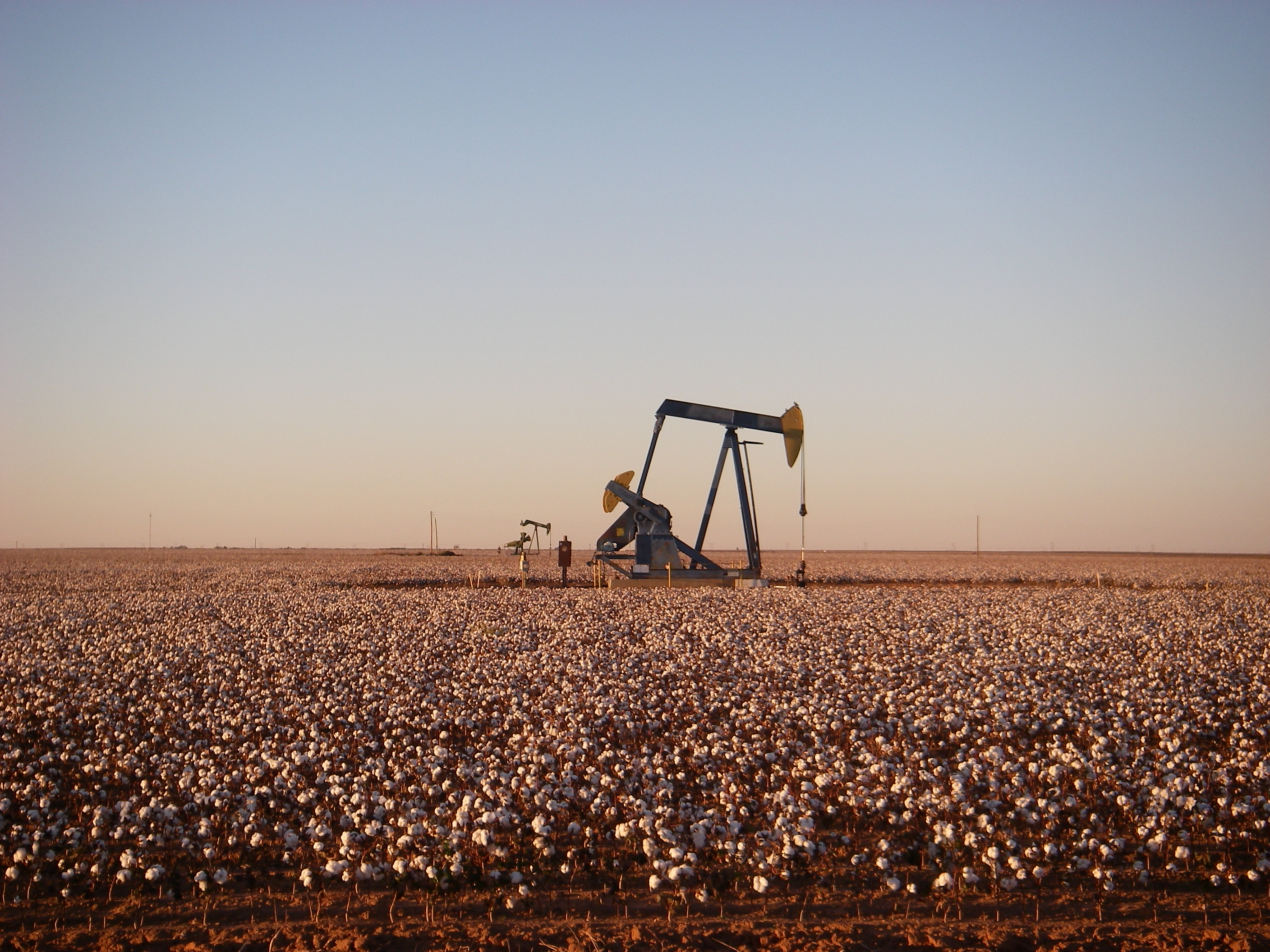
An active Permian Basin pumpjack east of Andrews, Texas

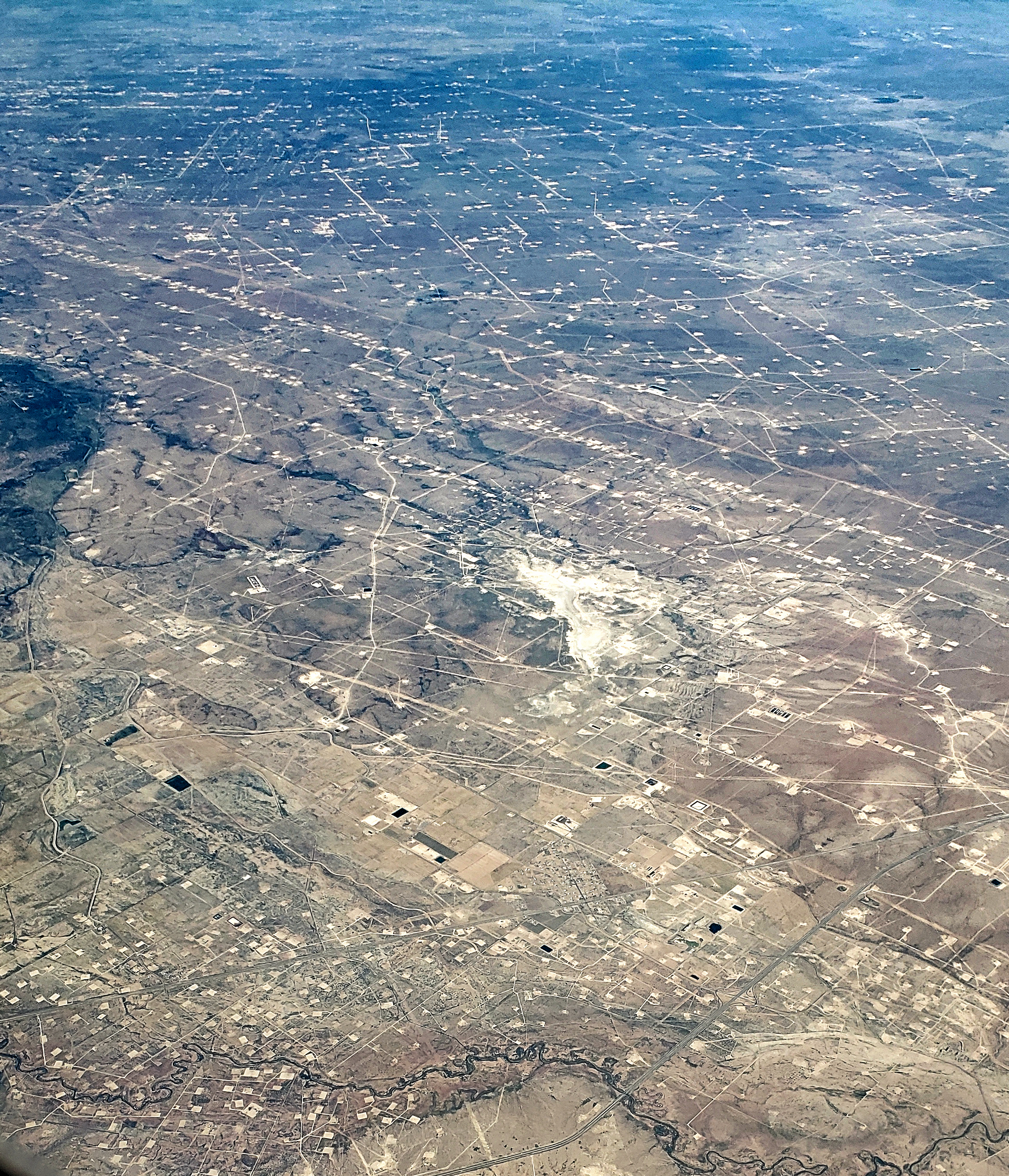
An aerial view of oil fields of the Permian Basin in Ward County, Texas

Due to its economic significance, the Permian Basin has also given its name to the geographic region in which it lies. The counties of this region include:

- Andrews County pop. 18,705
- Borden County pop. 648
- Brewster County pop. 9,267
- Chaves County pop. 64,615
- Cochran County pop. 2,836
- Coke County pop. 3,370
- Concho County pop. 4,276
- Cottle County pop. 1,389
- Crane County pop. 4,794
- Crockett County pop. 3,499
- Crosby County pop. 5,737
- Culberson County pop. 2,204
- Dawson County pop. 12,728
- Dickens County pop. 2,249
- Ector County pop. 166,223
- Eddy County pop. 58,460
- Edwards County pop. 1,928
- Fisher County pop. 3,974
- Floyd County pop. 5,837
- Gaines County pop. 20,901
- Garza County pop. 6,578
- Glasscock County pop. 1,388
- Hale County pop. 33,406
- Hockley County pop. 23,021
- Howard County pop. 36,664
- Hudspeth County pop. 4,886
- Irion County pop. 1,536
- Jeff Davis County pop. 2,252
- King County pop. 265
- Kimble County pop. 4,362
- Kent County pop. 277
- Knox County pop. 3,653
- Lamb County pop. 13,158
- Lea County pop. 71,070
- Loving County pop. 169
- Lubbock County pop. 310,569
- Lynn County pop. 5,951
- Martin County pop. 5,771
- McCulloch County pop. 7,987
- Menard County pop. 2,139
- Midland County pop. 176,832
- Mitchell County pop. 8,145
- Motley County pop. 1,234
- Nolan County pop. 14,714
- Pecos County pop. 15,673
- Presidio County pop. 6,948
- Reagan County pop. 3,741
- Reeves County pop. 15,976
- Runnels County pop. 10,234
- Schleicher County pop. 2,895
- Scurry County pop. 16,703
- Sterling County pop. 1,291
- Stonewall County pop. 1,362
- Sutton County pop. 3,758
- Taylor County pop. 138,034
- Terrell County pop. 823
- Terry County pop. 12,287
- Tom Green County pop. 119,200
- Upton County pop. 3,671
- Val Verde County pop. 49,025
- Ward County pop. 11,720
- Winkler County pop. 7,720
- Yoakum County pop. 8,591

== See also ==
- Geography of Texas
- University of Texas Permian Basin
- Permian Basin Petroleum Museum
- Permian Basin (Europe)
- Slaughter Field
- Val Verde Basin
- Spraberry Trend
