= Val Verde Basin =

Foreland basin

Coordinates: 30°00′N 101°20′W

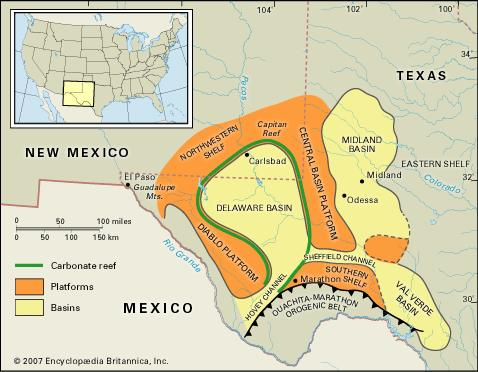
Map of the basins, reefs and platforms that make up the Permian Basin in West Texas

The Val Verde Basin is a marginal foreland basin located in West Texas, just southeast of the Midland Basin. The Val Verde is a sub-basin of the larger Permian Basin and is roughly 24–40 km wide by 240 km long. It is an unconventional system and its sediments were deposited during a long period of flooding during the Middle to Late Cretaceous. This flooding event is referred to as the Western Interior Seaway, and many basins in the Western United States can attribute their oil and gas producing basins to carbonate deposition during this time period.

The Val Verde's structural architecture devolved mainly during the Early Carboniferous to Late Permian period during the Ouachita orogeny. This produced minor structural folding throughout the basin. Today, the Val Verde Basin is a major gas producing system and has recently been recognized for harboring over 5 tcf (trillion cubic feet) of natural gas.

== Origin and evolution ==
The formation of the western interior seaway during the mid to late Cretaceous caused widespread carbonate deposition throughout most of the western United States. During this time period, the seaway flooded the North American mainland and divided the Eastern and Western portions of North America for roughly 60 million years.

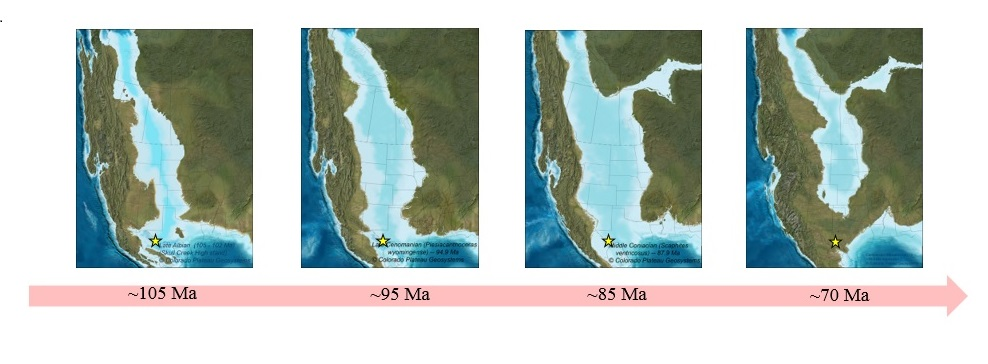
The Val Verde Basin, marked with a star, in relation to the evolution of the western interior seaway over time.

- ~ 105 Ma: Shallow, low energy environment
- ~ 95 Ma: Period of transgression, moderate - deep water deposits
- ~ 85 Ma: Continued transgression, moderate - deep water deposits
- ~ 70 Ma: Retreat of the Western Interior Seaway

Throughout this time period, marine fauna flourished in the warm, shallow water conditions. This led to widespread carbonate deposition throughout the region. Today, many basins throughout the region attribute their source rock and reservoir rock to the sedimentary deposits created during this time. As the seaway transgressed and regressed over time, alternating layers of sandstone and shale were deposited, depending on the depth and overall energy of the environment. This is when the modern-day reservoir rock of the Val Verde basin, the Ozona sequence, was deposited.

The structure of the Val Verde Basin formed as result of tectonic influences for the last ~100 million years.

== Major tectonic influences ==
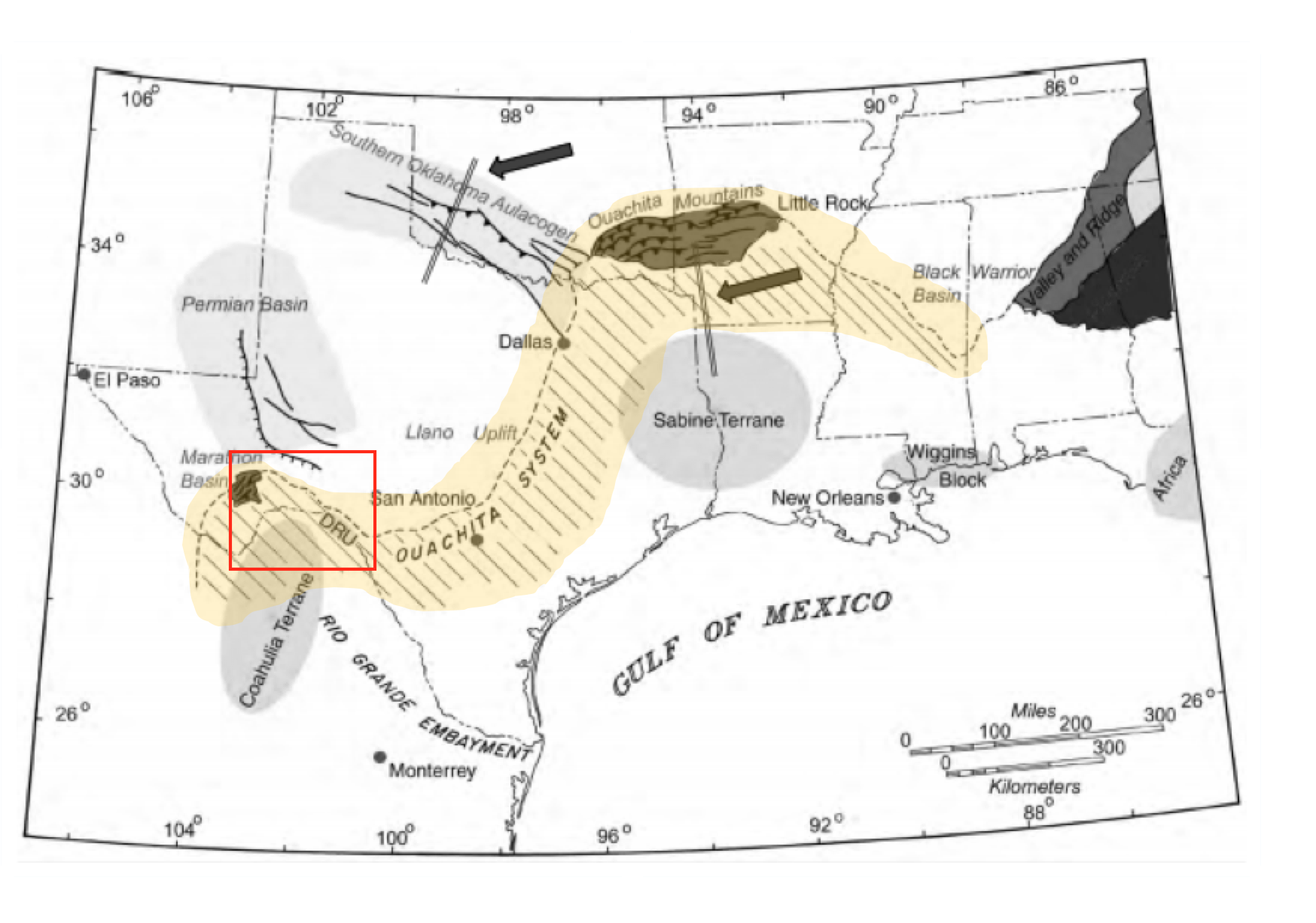
Regional deformation caused by the Ouachita orogeny

Syndepositional tectonic events produced the stratigraphic architecture, sandstone distribution and the lithofacies developments within the Val Verde. Although the basin is unconventional, sequence boundaries are marked by systematic shifting of sandstone depocenters in response to episodic thrusting events over time.

=== Ouachita orogeny:~318-271 Ma ===
As plate convergence from the Ouachita orogeny began and progressed from the north to the south, offlap and onlap stratigraphic geometries were produced. The orogeny contributed a large amount of sediments from clastic rocks. These were deposited as thick, subaqueous deltaic systems which gradually filled the modern day midland basin over time. The Ouachita Orogeny thrust belt caused regional compression which led to overthrust structures, faulting and folding throughout the region.

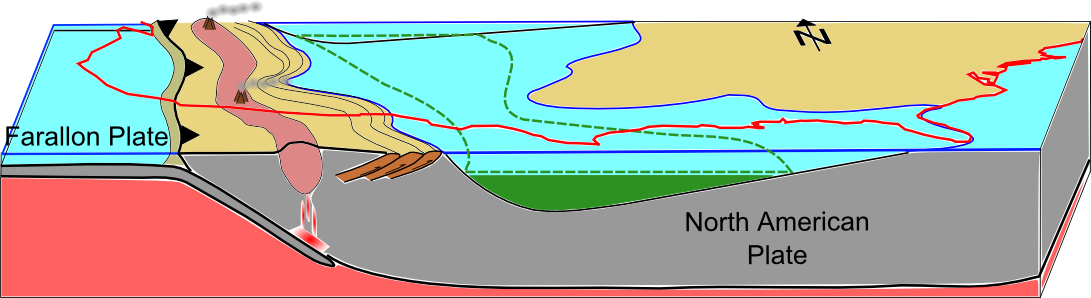
Schematic cross section of the Farallon Plate subducting beneath the North American Plate during shallow plate subduction

=== Laramide orogeny:~70-80 Ma ===
The Laramide orogeny was a major tectonic event that caused the most recent and significant deformation in the United States. The Subduction of the Farallon Plate beneath the North American Plate produced compression all across the western portion of the US. Crustal deformation occurred inland from the plate margin and it is mostly related to the deformation of northwestern United States. However this, in combination with Cenozoic rifting produced from the San Andreas fault, crustal folding, faulting and overall deformation have affected the southern regions of the continental US.

== Generalized cross section ==
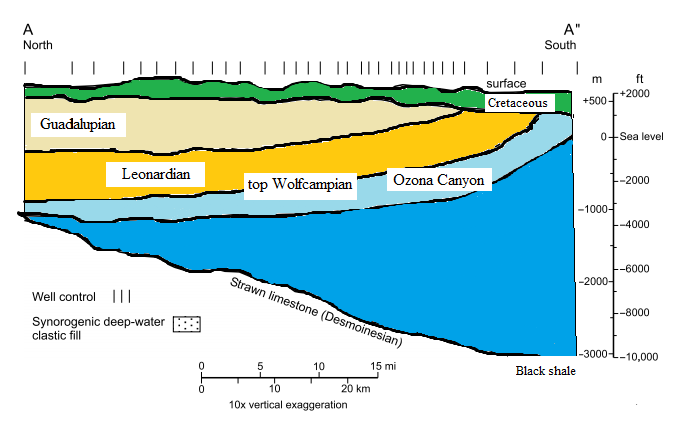
N-S Generalized cross section of the Val Verde basin, showing the main formations present in the subsurface. Modified after Hamlin et al. 2013

== Ozona sequence ==
The Ozona formation is part of the larger, unconventional Canyon sandstone system, a tight gas play within the Val Verde basin. Tight reservoirs such as this are characterized by low permeability and low porosity, however the basin is still gas saturated and currently producing today.

=== Characteristics of the Ozona lithofacies ===
A description of the lithofacies of the Ozona sequence:

Lithofacies	Lithology	Bed thickness	Sedimentary Structures	Accessories	Depositional mechanism
Thick-bedded turbidites	Fine to coarse sandstone, minor mudstone	Sandstone 1–10 ft	Sole marks, fluid escape, grading horizontal lamination	Mud clasts, organic debris, carbonate clasts	Intermediate-density turbidity currents
Thin-bedded turbidites	Fine to very fine sandstone, mudstone	Sandstone, mudstone <1.0 ft	Sole marks, horizontal and ripple lamination	Organic debris, burrows	Low-density turbidity currents
Mudstone	Mudstone, claystone	Variable	Horizontal lamination	Disseminated organic debris, burrows	Low-density turbidity currents, hemipelagic settling
Conglomeratic mudstone	Gravelly, sandy mudstone	Deformed bedding, unbedded	Floating clasts, soft-sediment deformation	Carbonate clasts, organic debris	Cohesive slumps, debris flow

- The Ozona is composed of 4 main lithofacies: thick-bedded turbidites, thin-bedded turbidites, mudstone and conglomeratic mudstone
- Thick and thinly bedded sandstones resemble deposits of mixed sandy and turbidity currents. In the Ozona sequence, the standard Bouma sequence of sedimentary structures properly characterizes the think and thinly bedded turbidites seen here.
- Some channel-based erosion may occur locally which deposited sediments along with the turbidite deposits

=== Characteristics of the Ozona genetic facies ===
A description of the genetic facies of the Ozona sequence:

Genetic facies	Primary lithofacies	Sandstone bed, vertical trends	Lateral continuities
Turbidite channel	Think-bedded turbidites	Upward thinning, uniformly thick	Discontinuous local continuity between channel and levee
Turbidite lobe	Thick- and think-bedded turbidites	Upward thinning, upward thickickening, uniformly thick	Continuous across lobe
Channel levee	Thin bedded turbidites	No trend	Similar to turbidite channel
Muddy turbidite sheet	Thin bedded turbidites, mudstone	No trend	Think-bed continuity (>16 km)
Hemipelagic drape	Mudstone	Not applicable	Thin bedded continuity (>16 km)
Mass transport complex	Conglomeratic mudstone	No trend	Highly discontinuous

Discontinuous beds are a relatively poor reservoir characteristic

- The hydrocarbon bearing lithologies are non-continuous. Instead they "pinch out" to form laterally discontinuous beds
- Pinching out sequences found throughout the basin:
  - Turbidite Channel, Turbedite lobe
  - Prograding Slope Channel and basin-floor Submarine Fan systems
- Turbidite lobe genetic facies are primarily sandstone dominated, although they are variable in their bedding sizes and styles.

== Strawn formation ==
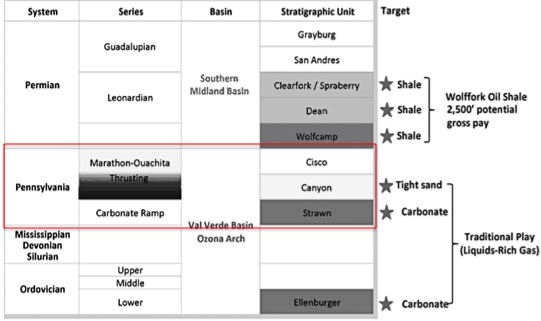

The Strawn formation is one of the more enigmatic hydrocarbon producing formations on the Eastern Shelf of the Midland Basin. It includes thick and thinly bedded sandstone units that are highly fossiliferous and reflects widespread carbonate deposition. Deposition was followed by "downwarping" and subsidence of the Midland Basin. The lower section of the formation is characterized by carbonate and siliciclastic deposits from 225 to 275 ft. in thickness. In some areas, thickness can reach up to 900 ft. However, the formation is known to thin out towards the west-southwest.

== Depositional systems ==
The primary depositional systems within the Ozona are along deep-water slopes and basin-floor geomorphic settings. The deep water slopes drive the formation of turbidity deposits while the turbidite lobes form as a result of sediment deposition over time along the basin-floor. The thickness of these deposits is variable throughout the basin, but it is the thickest in the southwestern portion of the basin, following a northeast trend.

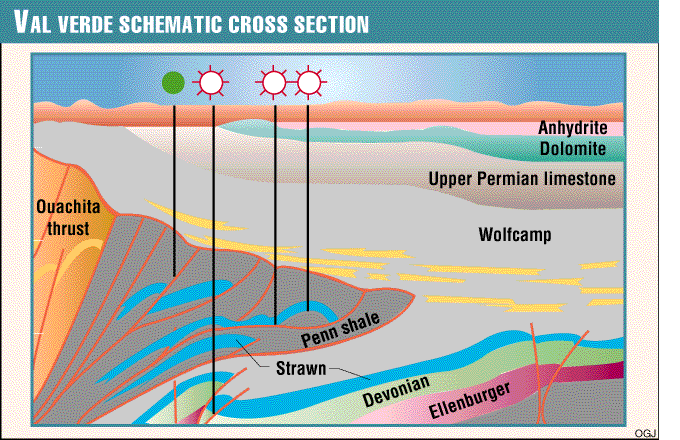

== Basin production ==
Despite the Val Verde's tight gas plays and relatively poor reservoir quality, it is still producing today. The Canyon Sandstone has produced more than 3.5 trillion cubic feet of gas. The most recent reports from the U.S Geological Survey in 2016 indicates that the basin is capable of producing a total of 5 trillion cubic feet. Roughly 40% of the total gas production is generated from the Ozona field.

The Verde has three gas structures: the Puckett, Grey Ranch and Brown Bassett fields, which were discovered in the 1950s and 1960s. In total, these three gas fields have produced ~13 trillion cubic feet of gas so far, and are projected to produce a total of ~20 trillion cubic feet from deep (~14,000 ft deep) Ordovician carbonates.
