= Slaughter Field =

Oil field in Texas, USA

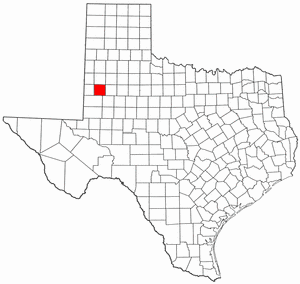
Location of Slaughter Field

Slaughter Field is a 100,000 acres (400 km^{2})+ conventional oil and gas field 40 miles west of Lubbock, TX in Cochran, Hockley, and Terry Counties. It was discovered in 1936 by a three-way venture between Honolulu Oil Company, Devonian Oil Company, and Cascade Petroleum Company. The area was originally two different fields: Duggan Field (on the west) and Slaughter Field (on the east). When it was proven that both Duggan Field and Slaughter Field were producing from the same formation, they were combined under a single field regulation named Slaughter Field. In March 2015, it ranked 25th on the United States Energy Information's Top 100 U.S. Oil and Gas Fields.

== Geologic setting ==
Slaughter Field is located on the Northern Shelf (also commonly referred to as the Northwestern Shelf) of the Permian Basin. However, it is specifically related to the Midland Basin, one of the three major features within the Greater Permian Basin. It is a ramp-type carbonate field that produces from ~450 to 750 feet below the top of the San Andres member of the Permian section.

== Basin development ==
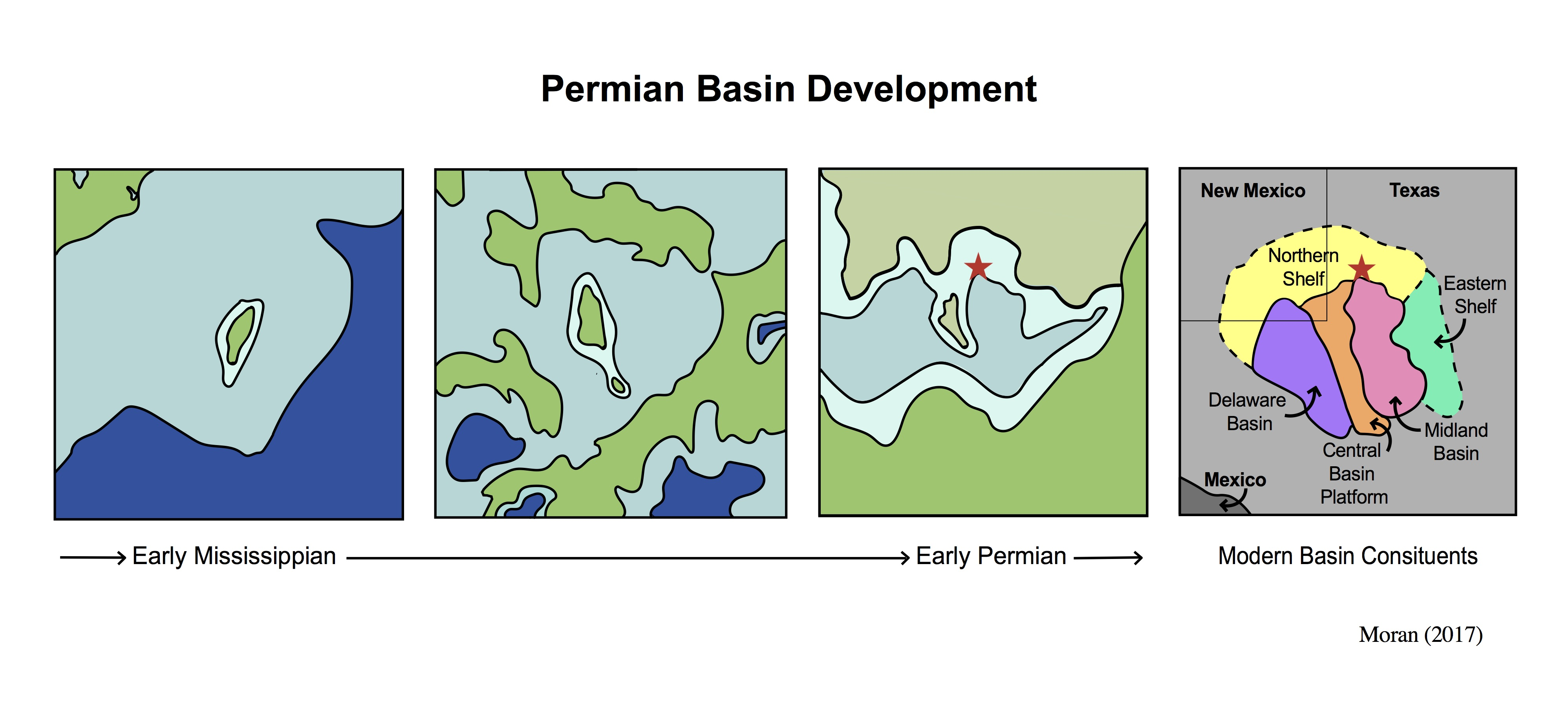
Model of the Permian Basin's development throughout geologic time and the resultant modern constituents. Red star indicates the location of Slaughter Field.

Prior to the formation of the Permian Basin, this area was the expansive marine environment of the Tobosa Basin. In the development of the Greater Permian Basin, there are three main contributing factors. Firstly, mass deposition of clastic sediments causing the initial depression. Following this mass deposition, the collision of supercontinents Laurasia and Gondwana to form Pangea with associated faulting and uplift. Finally, basin filling. Due to faulting, uplift, erosion, and varying rates of subsidence, the Tobosa Basin was segregated into sub-basins and platforms. The three major constituents of the basin are the Delaware Basin, Central Basin Platform, and Midland Basin. Other important constituents are the Northern Shelf and Eastern Shelf. There are several other structures associated with the formation of the basin that do not directly affect Slaughter Field.

The two sub-basins, Delaware and Midland, rapidly subsided while the Central Basin Platform did not suffer a change in elevation. Prior to the Permian, the Midland Basin was already subjected to considerable deposition of clastic material related to the Ouachita Orogeny. A substantial subaqueous deltaic system developed because of this mass deposition that composed the majority of the basin. By the Middle Permian, the basin was covered with floodplains and almost completely filled. These processes created what is now the Permian Basin and its major constituents.

== Stratigraphy ==
The San Andres is a formation at the base of the Guadalupian Epoch in the Permian Period. It consists of mainly dolomite and anhydrite and is deposited on top of the sandy Dolomite of the Glorietta Formation in the Leonardian Epoch. Above the San Andres is the anhydrite, shale, and sandstone of the Grayburg Formation. Specifically in Slaughter Field, the San Andres formation is capped by a substantial layer of evaporites. Most of the Upper Permian hydrocarbon reservoirs are found within the San Andres and Grayburg Formations. Within the Northern Shelf, the San Andres Formation is approximately 1500 feet thick. The upper and lower San Andres is divided by a distinct later of siltstone up to 10 feet thick.

== Depositional environments ==
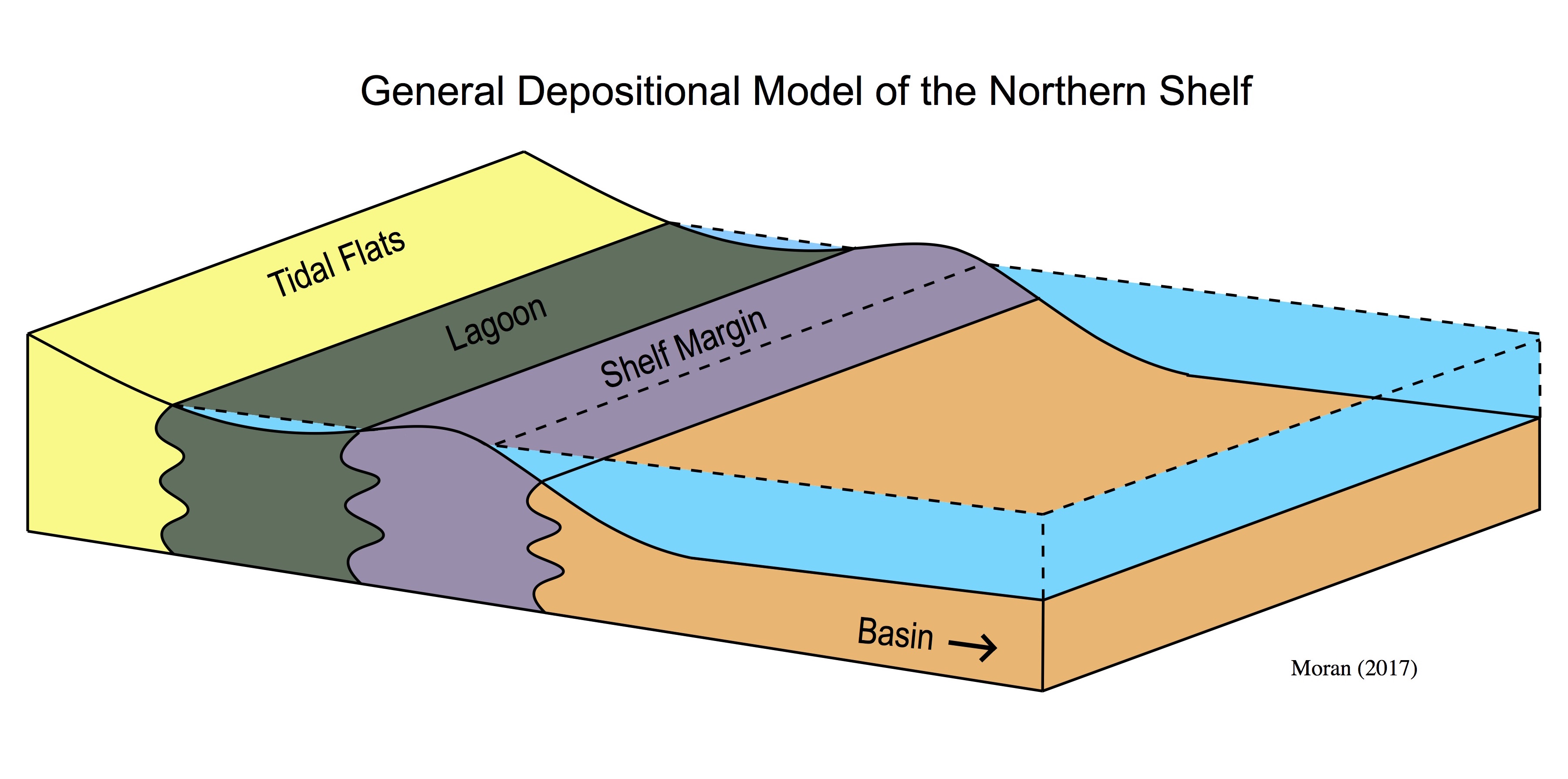
Basic depositional model of the Northern Shelf of the Permian Basin showing the three main depositional environments associated with Slaughter Field.

The region of Slaughter Field can be characterized by three main depositional environments: the shoals of the shelf margin, lagoonal evaporites, and the wackestones and packstones in the tidal flats. These environments result from the cyclic deposits in a regressive series. These deposits prograde to the south across the broad, shallow marine Northern Shelf.

== Reservoir characteristics ==
The San Andres Formation of Slaughter Field is a restricted platform carbonate play consisting of flat-lying, bioturbated wackestones and packstones of the San Andres Formation and produces from nearly 5000 feet depth. This is the younger, shallower section of the lower San Andres. The reservoir rock has an average porosity of approximately 11% and a uniform permeability of 0.2 to 30 mD. The source rock is organic-rich calcareous shale and shaley limestone. Most of the oil and gas migrates long distances up to the Northern Shelf from the Midland Basin. This most likely allows the oil in the San Andres to be more mature that the rest of the Upper Permian. The trap is stratigraphic with an up-dip porosity pinch out.

== Production ==
Slaughter Field produces sour crude oil with an API gravity of 29° - 31°. It is also produced natural gas well into the interior of the Northern Shelf. The Northern Shelf, the greatest producing region in the entire Permian Basin, has successfully produced over four billion barrels of oil. After the field was discovered in 1937, primary production was through depletion and solution gas drive. Secondary recovery was conducted from the 1960s to 1970s through infill drilling programs. In 1980, CO_{2} flooding was initiated in the south/southeastern region of the field. There are over 6000 wells in Slaughter Field with various operators throughout its existence. This field has produced more than 1.2 billion barrels of oil and approximately 172,540,000 mcf of gas.
