= Vital Energy =

American energy Company

Vital Energy, Inc.
- Company type: Public
- Traded as: NYSE: VTLE; S&P 600 component Russell 2000 Index component
- Industry: Petroleum industry
- Founded: October 2006; 19 years ago
- Founder: Randy A. Foutch
- Headquarters: Tulsa, Oklahoma, United States
- Key people: Jason Pigott, President & CEO
- Products: Natural gas Petroleum
- Production output: 87 thousand barrels of oil equivalent (530,000 GJ) per day (2020)
- Revenue: ▼$677 million (2020)
- Net income: ▼ -$874 million (2020)
- Total assets: ▼$1.442 billion (2020)
- Total equity: ▼ -$21 million (2020)
- Owner: Crescent Energy
- Number of employees: 257 (2020)
- Website: vitalenergy.com

Vital Energy, Inc. (formerly Laredo Petroleum, Inc.) is an American company engaged in hydrocarbon exploration. Incorporated in Delaware, its principal operational headquarters located in Tulsa, Oklahoma.

Laredo Petroleum has no connection or association with Laredo Oil, a penny stock E&P traded on the pink sheet over-the-counter market. The company drills almost all of its wells using what it calls the "earth model", which it claims increases efficiency.

As of December 31, 2020, the firm had 278 million barrels of oil equivalent (1.70×10^{9} GJ) of estimated proved reserves, of which 24% was petroleum, 36% was natural-gas condensates and 39% was natural gas. All of these reserves were in the Permian Basin, where the company controlled 133,199 net acres.

On December 15, 2025, Crescent Energy completed its acquisition of Vital Enerny.

== History ==
Founded in 2006 by Randy A. Foutch, the company acquired Broad Oak Energy five years later in a $1 billion transaction, expanding its presence in the Permian Basin and the Cline Shale. On December 20, 2011, the company became a public company via an initial public offering.

In May 2013, the firm sold its assets in the Anadarko Basin in western Oklahoma and Texas to affiliates of EnerVest Ltd for $438 million to raise capital for its drilling activities in the Permian Basin.

In July 2016, a year before selling its interest in Medallion Pipeline, it acquired additional acreage in the Midland Basin for $125 million. In 2023, Laredo Petroleum rebranded to Vital Energy, Inc.

Oil and gas company, Crescent Energy, agreed to acquire the company in August 2025 in an all-stock deal valued at $3.1 billion, including debt. The transaction was completed three months later.

== See also ==
- List of oil exploration and production companies
