= Ouachita geosyncline =

The Ouachita geosyncline was a major structural or sedimentary basin along southern North America. It is mostly covered by sedimentary rocks from the late Paleozoic and Mesozoic, but rocks of the former basin outcrop in the Llano Uplift near the Austin region, spanning Oklahoma and Arkansas, where it forms the Ouachita Mountains. The basin formed during the Paleozoic from the Ordovician through the Mississippian. The basin was involved in the Ouachita orogeny during the Pennsylvanian.
