= Marathon Uplift =

Paleogene-age geological event and feature in Texas, United States

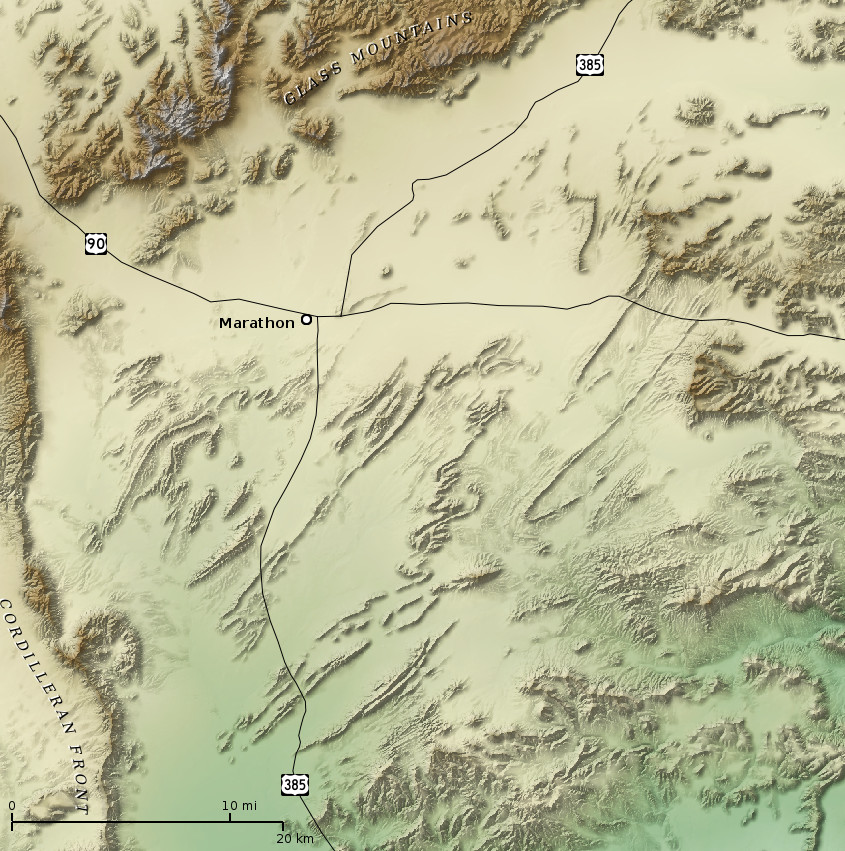
- Exposed ridges of the Ouachita orogeny trend northeast near Marathon, Texas.

Geography
- Location within Texas
- Country: United States
- State: Texas
- County: Brewster County
- Range coordinates: 30°12′27″N 103°14′36″W

Geology
- Mountain type: Uplift

The Marathon Uplift is a Paleogene-age domal uplift, approximately 78 miles (126 km) in diameter, in southwest Texas. The Marathon Basin was created by erosion of Cretaceous and younger strata from the crest of the uplift.

Northeast trending ridges of pre-Permian Paleozoic strata in the basin were formed by the Ouachita orogeny, which also formed the Ouachita Mountains of Arkansas and Oklahoma. The ancient faulting that produced the Llano Uplift is believed to be related to that which produced the Marathon Uplift in west Texas. Both may have been formed around the time of the Ouachita orogeny.

== See also ==
- Llano Uplift
- Solitario
