= Cline Shale =

Group of oil fields in Midland, Texas

Coordinates: 32.1706°N 101.7133°W

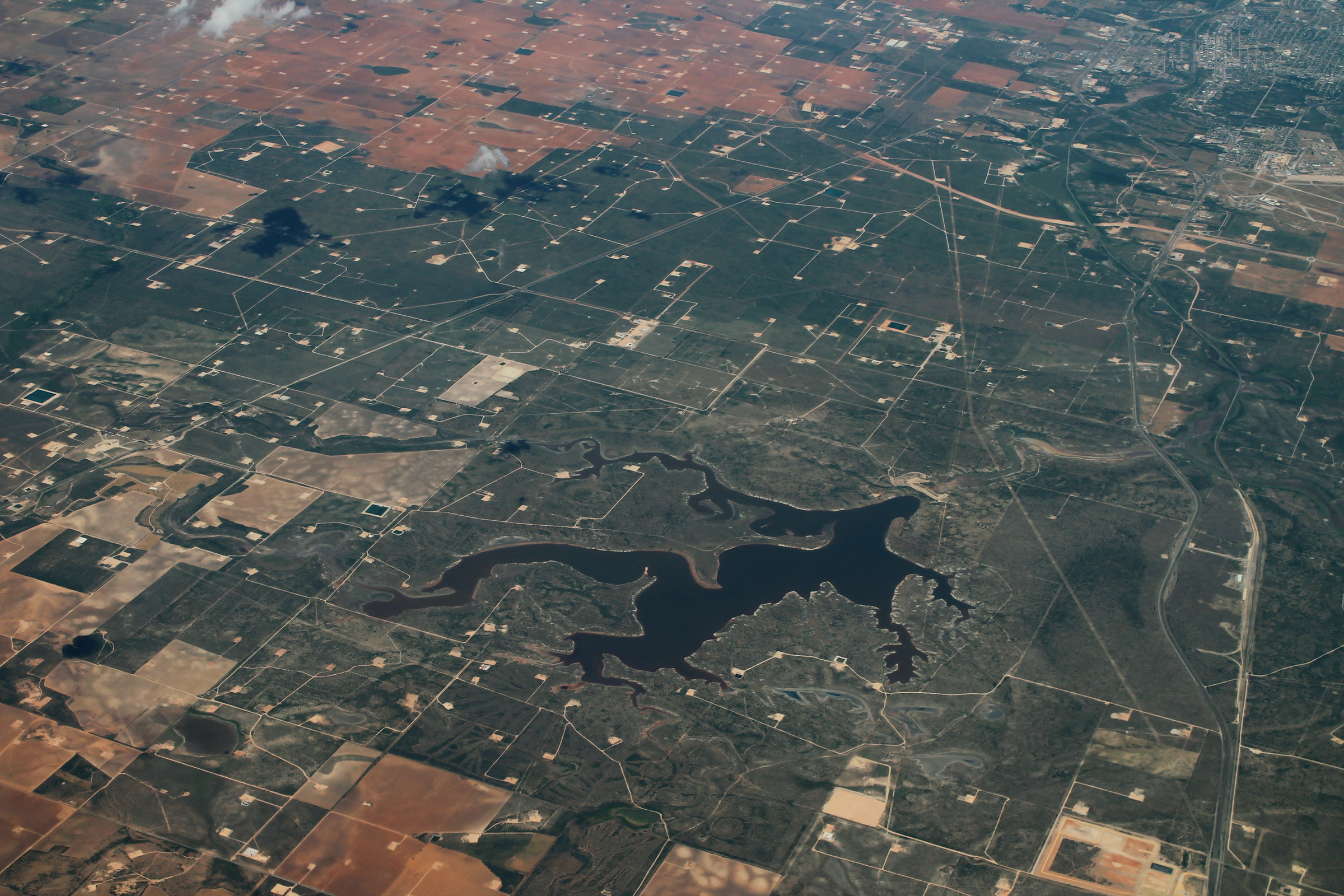
Cline Shale oil wells near Big Spring, Texas

As of 2013 the Cline Shale, also referred to as the "Wolfcamp/Cline Shale", the "Lower Wolfcamp Shale", or the "Spraberry-Wolfcamp shale", (Note: ExxonMobil is the largest acreage holder in Spraberry-Wolfcamp.) or even the "Wolfberry", is a promising Pennsylvanian oil play east of Midland, Texas, which underlies ten counties: Fisher, Nolan, Sterling, Coke, Glasscock, Tom Green, Howard, Mitchell, Borden and Scurry counties. Exploitation is projected to rely on hydraulic fracturing.

an organic rich shale, with Total Organic Content (TOC) of 1-8%, with silt and sand beds mixed in. It lies in a broad shelf, with minimal relief and has nice light oil of 38-42 gravity with excellent porosity of 6-12% in thickness varying 200 to 550 feet thick.

The total recovery was estimated to 30 billion barrels in 2012, and United States Geological Survey estimated the technically recoverable reserve to 20 billion barrels in 2016, the largest USGS estimate ever and nearly three times larger than that of the 2013 USGS Bakken-Three Forks resource assessment in North Dakota. The field also seems to contain 16 trillion cubic feet of natural gas. This is the first assessment of continuous resources in the Wolfcamp shale in the Midland Basin portion of the Permian. During the 1980s, vertical wells produced oil in the Wolfcamp area. However, since 2000 in North America, horizontal drilling or porpoising along with hydraulic fracturing have grown tremendously and are tapping the continuous oil reserve. In Odessa, Chris Schenk, a Denver-based research geologist and assessment team member, told KWES, "This oil has been known there for a long time -- our task is to estimate what we think the volume of recoverable oil is." According to Morris Burns, a local oil expert and former president of the Permian Basin Petroleum Association, 50% to 60% is recoverable beginning at a price range of $60 to $65 per barrel. This area is the largest continuous oil discovery in the United States and encompasses the cities of both Lubbock and Midland which are 118 miles apart. (Note: Continuous oil accumulation - a "continuous” or "unconventional" oil accumulation means that the oil resource is dispersed throughout a geologic formation rather than existing as discrete, localized occurrences, such as those in conventional accumulations. Unconventional resources often require special technical drilling and recovery methods.)

The Cline Shale is more generally referred to as the Lower Wolfcamp Shale. The Cline is a small part of the greater Wolfcamp Shale Formation. (Note: Broad Oak Energy is credited with the discovery of the play by its drilling of the first Wolfcamp Shale well, the Sugg A159 AH well, in July 2009. Since July 2011, Broad Oak Energy is owned by Laredo Petroleum.)

== External links and further reading ==
- Cline Shale Central - Online Guide to the Cline Shale
- Maps and diagram
- USGS maps of the continuous oil locations of Wolfcamp shale within the Permian Basin
