= Solitario =

Laccolith remnants in Texas, USA

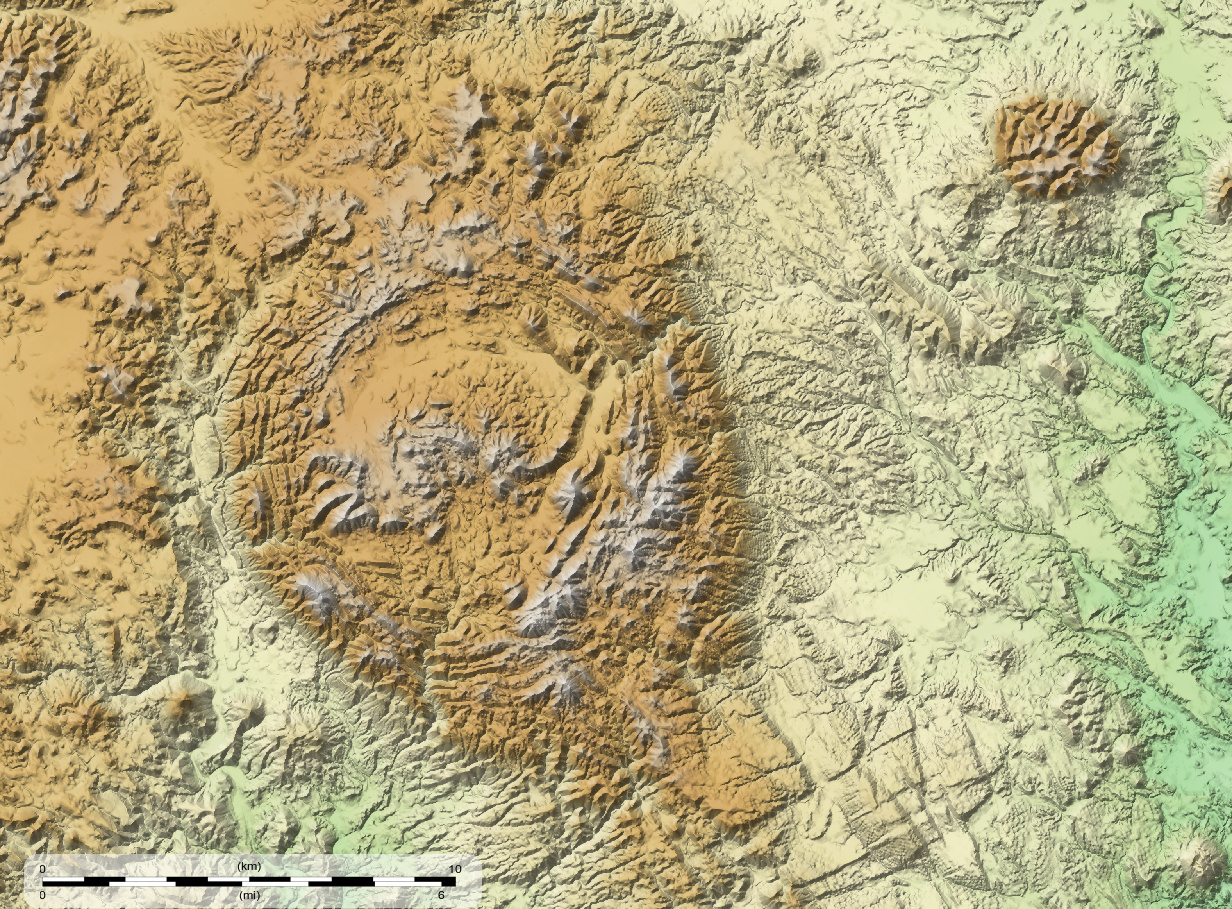

Highest point
- Elevation: 4,619 ft (1,408 m)
- Prominence: 1,000 ft (300 m)
- Coordinates: 29°27′03″N 103°48′32″W

Geography
- Location within Texas
- Location: Location: Brewster County and Presidio County
- Topo map: USGS The Solitario

Geology
- Mountain type(s): Laccolith, caldera
- Volcanic arc: Big Bend Volcanic Arc
- Last eruption: Eocene

The Solitario (El Solitario) is a large geologic formation in Big Bend Ranch State Park in West Texas. When viewed from above, it suggests an impact crater; though it is actually the eroded remains of a laccolith. The approximate center of the Solitario is located 56.8 km (35.3 mi) east southeast of Presidio, Texas, just west of the line dividing Brewster and Presidio Counties. The formation covers a circular area of approximately 135 km^{2} (52 sq mi). The geology of the Solitario is complex. In 1988, the state of Texas purchased the property containing the Solitario and created Big Bend Ranch State Park.

The formation lies in the Chihuahuan Desert ecoregion of the United States.

== Geology ==
The Solitario is a structural dome developed in Paleozoic and Cretaceous rocks above an Eocene granite laccolith intrusion. The dome is associated with radial rhyolite to trachyte dikes and sills and erupted ash flow tuffs. The 16-kilometer-diameter (9.9 mi) dome contains a 6-by-2-kilometre (3.7 by 1.2 mi) volcanic caldera filled with collapse breccia, tuff, and trachyte lava.

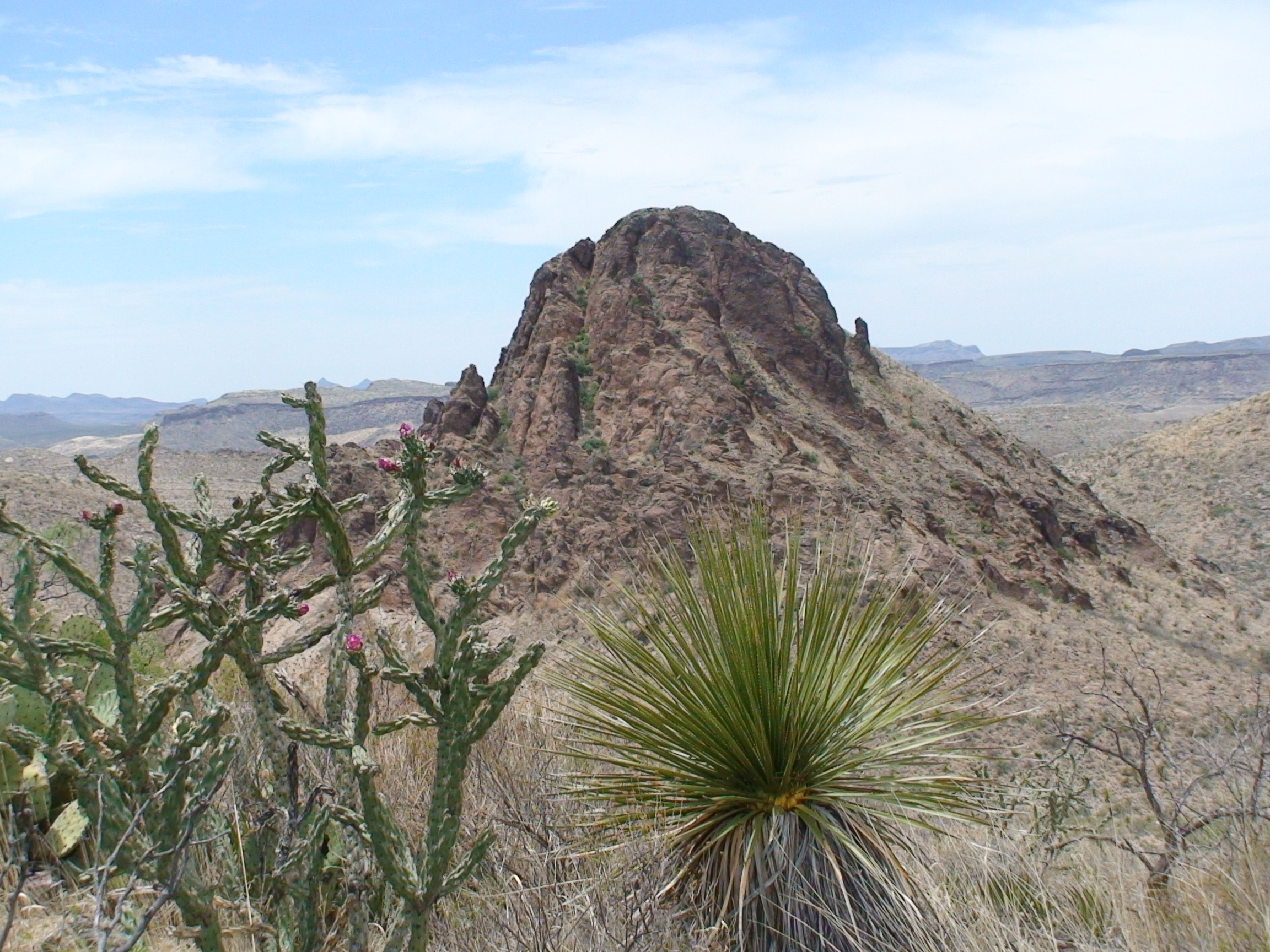
Solitario Peak (4786 ft) is a prominent geologic feature of Solitario

The Paleozoic rocks of the dome consist of a 2.6-kilometer-thick (1.6 mi) section of intensely-folded Cambrian through Early Pennsylvanian sediments. The Paleozoic rocks were deformed and thrust into the area from the southeast during the Ouachita orogeny. The Permian uplift and erosion during most of the Mesozoic was followed by deposition of Cretaceous carbonate rocks which correlate with the Cretaceous of the Gulf Coast. The area was uplifted by the Laramide orogeny during the latest Cretaceous. Following the Eocene intrusive and volcanic events of the Solitario, the area was partially covered by volcanic rocks from the adjacent Bofecillos volcanic center to the west of the area during the Oligocene and early Miocene. Erosion and downcutting following the Pleistocene deepening of the Rio Grande to the southwest and south have produced the current topographic expression of the area.

== See also ==
- Big Bend National Park
- List of Texas state parks
- Trans-Pecos
- Guadalupe Mountains
- McKittrick Canyon
- Richat Structure
