= Ouachita orogeny =

Mountain-building event that resulted in the Ouachita Mountains

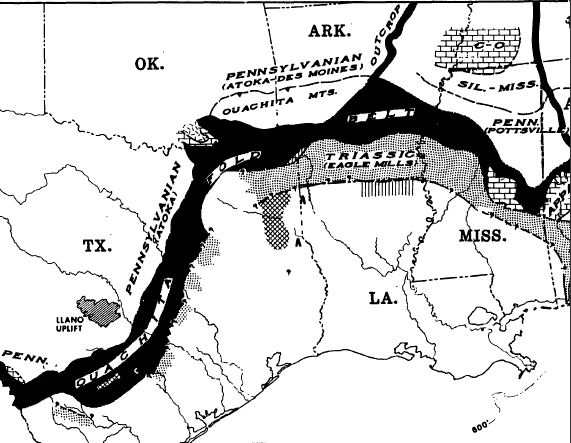
Ouachita Orogeny geological map

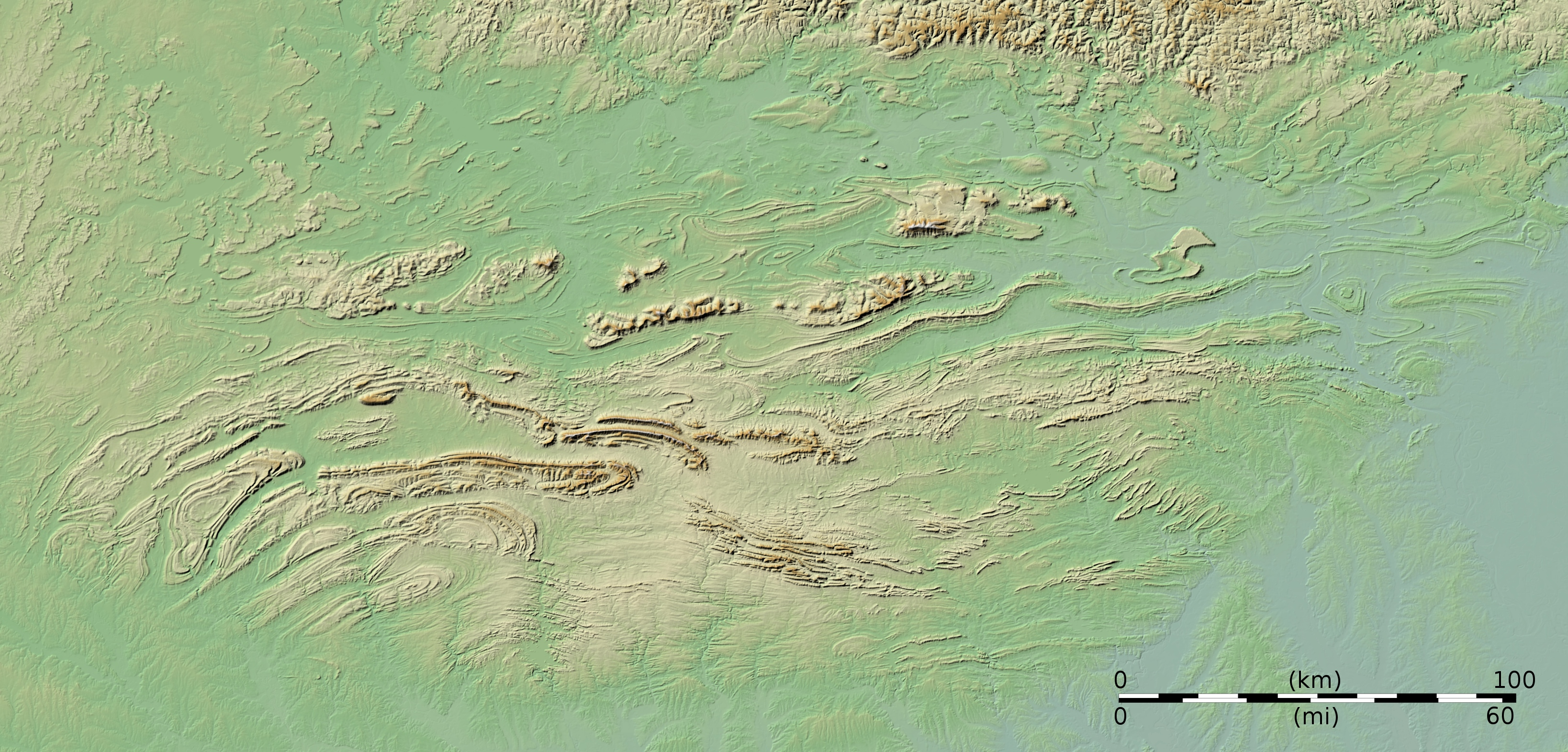
The Ouachita Mountains lie south of the Arkansas River valley which separates them from the Ozark plateau.

The Ouachita orogeny was a mountain-building event that resulted in the folding and faulting of strata currently exposed in the Ouachita Mountains. The more extensive Ouachita system extends from the current range in Arkansas and Oklahoma southeast to the Black Warrior Basin in Alabama and to the southwest through the Llano, Marathon, and Solitario uplifts in Texas on into Coahuila and Chihuahua in Mexico.

== Pre-collision formations ==
The region during the early Paleozoic lay off the coast of the southern portion of Laurentia, in what is now the southern United States. Laurentia straddled the equator at the time and the Rheic Ocean was to the south of Laurentia. Through the Ordovician, Silurian, Devonian, and early Carboniferous, marine sedimentation left extensive deposits of black shale, quartzose sandstone, and chert beds. During the Mississippian, a flysch sequence with dark shales and graywackes was deposited. Lenses of silicic tuff exist as evidence of limited volcanism. These later sediments were formed over a subduction zone which formed along southern Laurentia.

== Collision ==
South America approached Laurentia as the intervening oceanic crust was subducted. The collision of South American and Laurentian continental crust compressed and uplifted the region to form the Ouachita Mountains. During the Pennsylvanian and Permian, river systems draining westward from the Ouachita Mountains deposited sediments in north-central Texas and Oklahoma, which are now exposed at the surface. The Ouachita Mountains were extensively eroded between the Permian and the Jurassic, and much of the Ouachita system was subsequently buried beneath Mesozoic and Cenozoic sediments to the southeast and southwest. The structures there have only been revealed through deep drilling in petroleum exploration.
