= Downtown Austin =

Neighborhood in Austin, Texas

Coordinates: 30.271°N 97.743°W

Area map

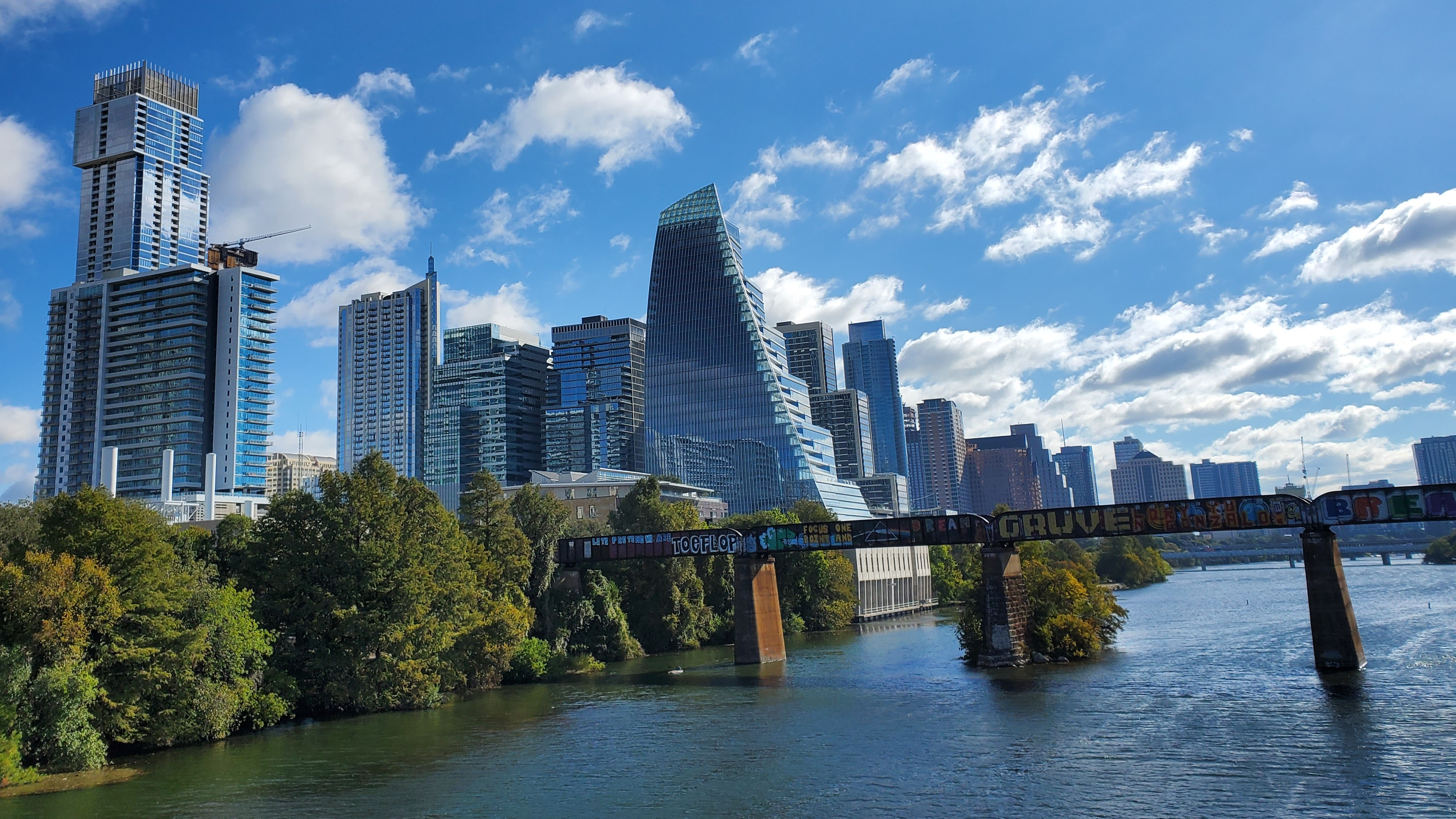
Austin skyline

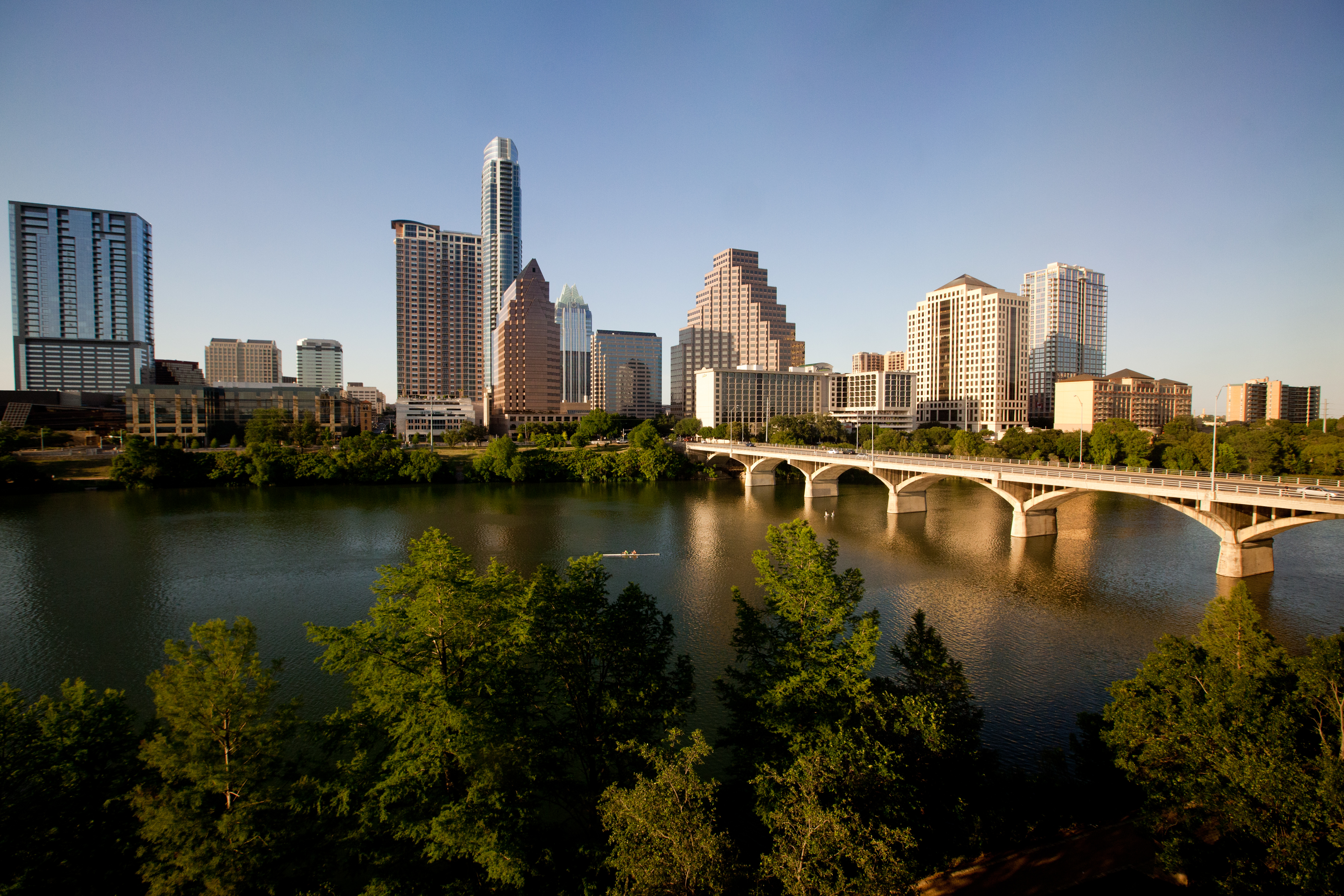
Austin skyline

Downtown Austin is the central business district of Austin, Texas, United States. The area of the district is bound by Lamar Boulevard to the west, Martin Luther King Jr. Boulevard to the north, Interstate 35 to the east, and Lady Bird Lake to the south.

Downtown Austin is where most of the city's high-rise buildings are located, as well as being the center of government and business for the region. It is currently experiencing a building boom, with many condos and high-rise towers being built. The top three tallest condo buildings west of the Mississippi River are all located in downtown Austin: The Independent, The Austonian, and the 360 Condominiums.

Downtown Austin and Downtown San Antonio are approximately 80 miles (129 km) apart, and both fall along the Interstate 35 corridor. This combined metropolitan region of San Antonio–Austin has approximately 5 million people.

== History ==
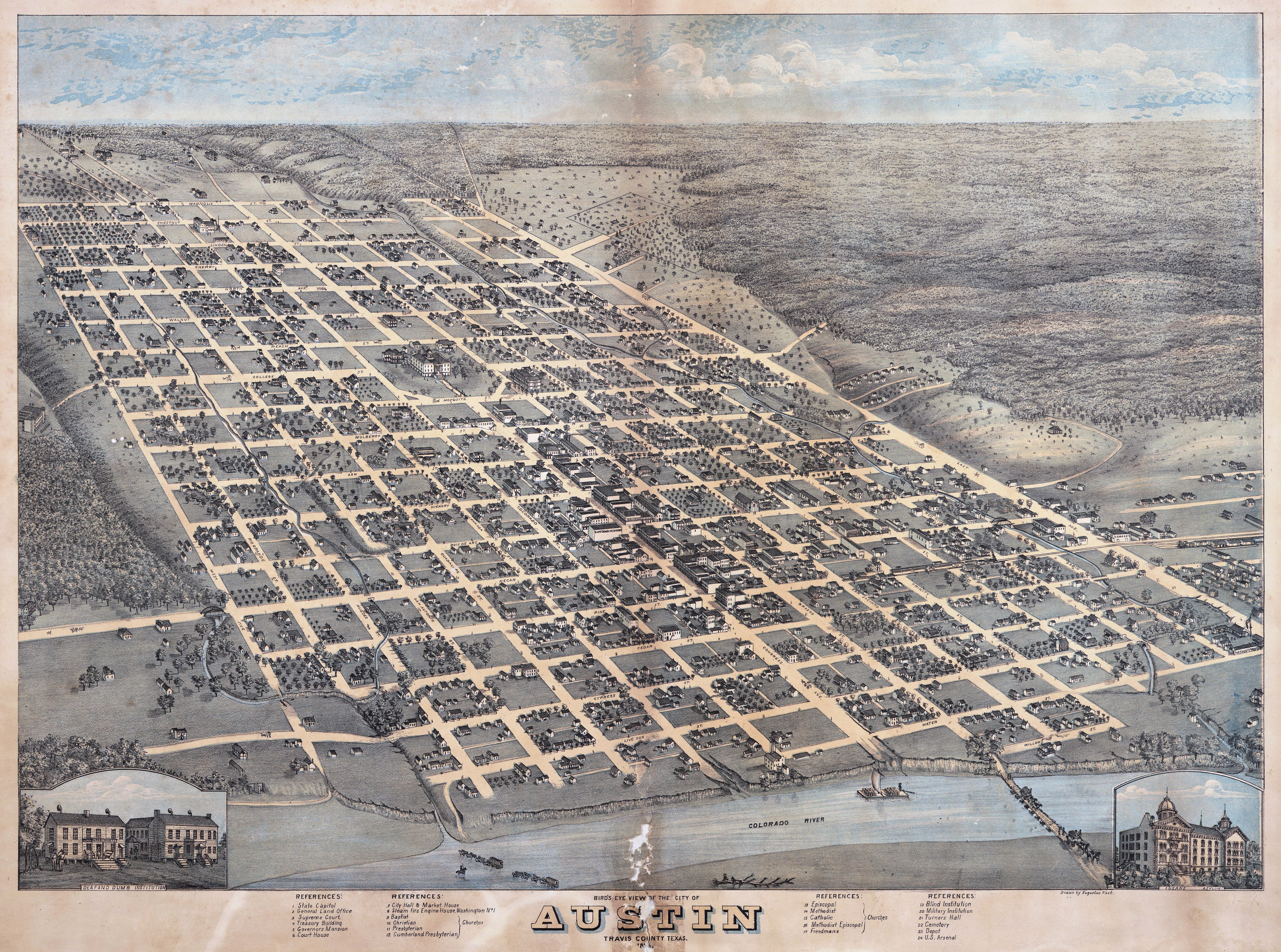
An 1873 illustration of Edwin Waller's layout for Austin

The story of Downtown Austin began with the Republic of Texas and President Mirabeau B. Lamar in the 1830s. Lamar tapped Edwin Waller to direct the planning and construction of the new town. Waller chose a site on a bluff above the Colorado River, nestled between Shoal Creek to the west and Waller Creek to the east. Waller and a team of surveyors developed Austin's first city plan, commonly known as the Waller Plan, dividing the site into a simple grid pattern on a 640-acre (or one square-mile plot) with 14 blocks running in both directions. Much of this original design is still intact in downtown Austin today.

Shoal Creek beneath the Third Street Railroad Trestle, a bridge built around 1922

One grand avenue, which Lamar named "Congress", cut through the center of town from Capitol Square down to the Colorado River. The streets running north–south (paralleling Congress) were named for Texas rivers with their order of placement matching the order of rivers on the Texas state map. The east–west streets were named after trees native to the region, despite the fact that Waller had recommended using numbers (they were eventually changed to numbers in 1884). The city's perimeters stretched north to south from the river at 1st Street to 15th Street, and from East Avenue (now Interstate 35) to West Avenue.

Waller reserved key spots for public buildings and four public squares. Three of Waller's original squares survive to this day: Wooldridge Park, Republic Square and Brush Square.

== Downtown districts ==
=== Congress Avenue ===
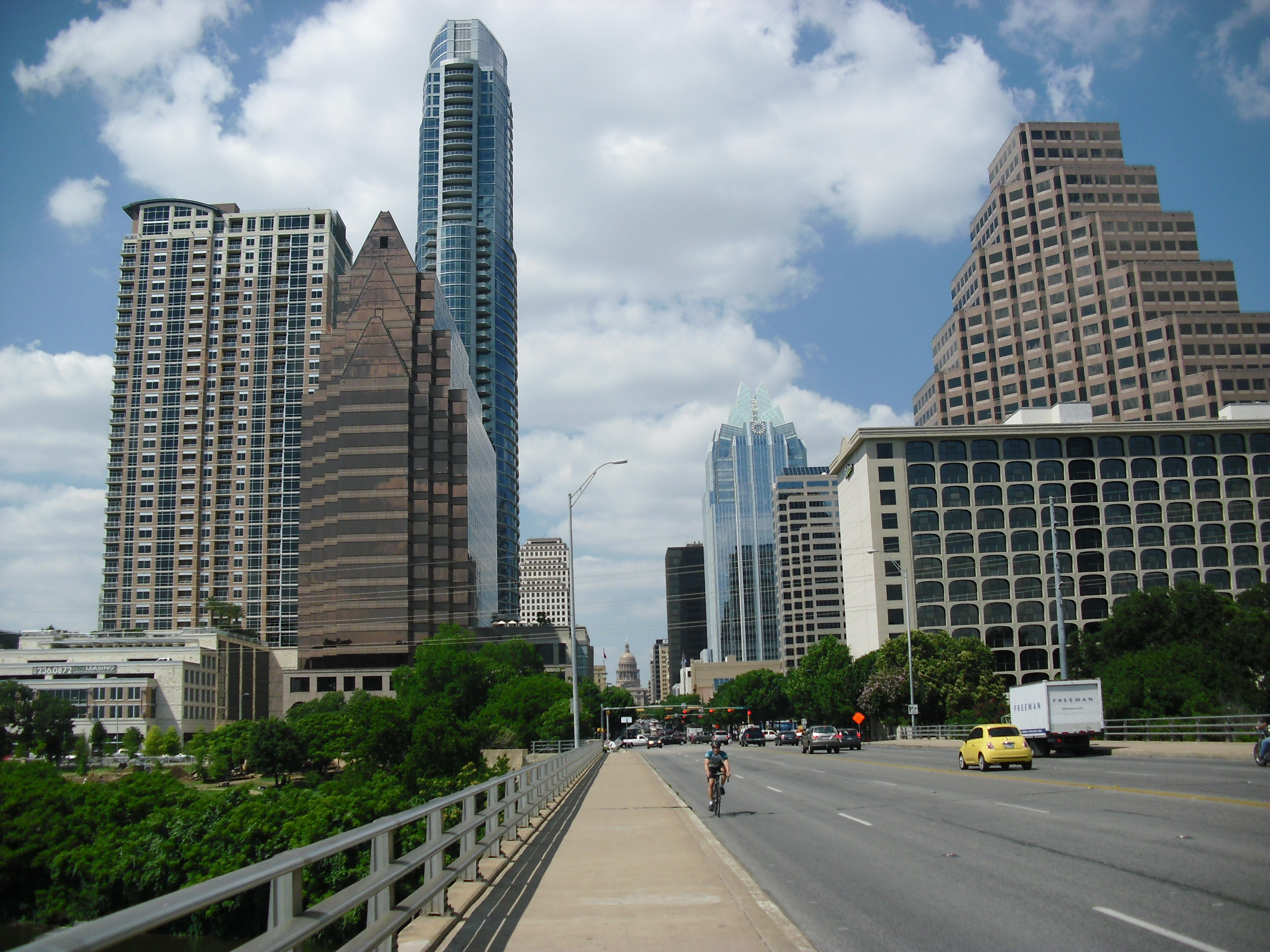
Downtown Austin from Congress Avenue Bridge, with Texas State Capitol in background, 2012

Edwin Waller, the first mayor of Austin, designed Congress Avenue to be Austin's most prominent street. Planned as the widest street in the original 1839 Austin plan, the 120-foot wide Congress Avenue initially ran from the Colorado River north to the State Capitol. Not coincidentally, Congress was the most important street in Austin city life during the 19th century. Early structures along Congress Avenue included government buildings, hotels, saloons, retail stores and restaurants. By the late 1840s "The Avenue" formed a well-established business district. The mid-1870s introduced gaslight illumination and mule-driven streetcars as well as construction of a new Travis County courthouse at Eleventh Street.

Stretching from First Street north to Eleventh Street, the Congress Avenue Historic District was created on August 11, 1978. Stylistically, the dominating structures of significance reflected general Victorian form and detailing, tempered by local materials and building techniques. Notable structures along Congress Avenue north of the Colorado include the Texas State Capitol, Paramount Theatre, the Scarbrough and Littlefield Buildings, the Southwestern Telegraph and Telephone Building, Gethsemane Lutheran Church and the Old Bakery.

=== Second Street District ===
Architectural pixel art displayed on the façade of the JW Marriott while closed under COVID-19 restrictions

The Second Street District is an entertainment and shopping district in Downtown Austin, just north of Lady Bird Lake and an area of great focus for development for the city, particularly between 2000–2012. Stretching six city blocks, notable buildings and complexes located within the district include Austin City Hall and Block 21, a mixed-use development featuring W Austin Hotel and Residences and Austin City Limits Live at The Moody Theater.

=== Sixth Street ===
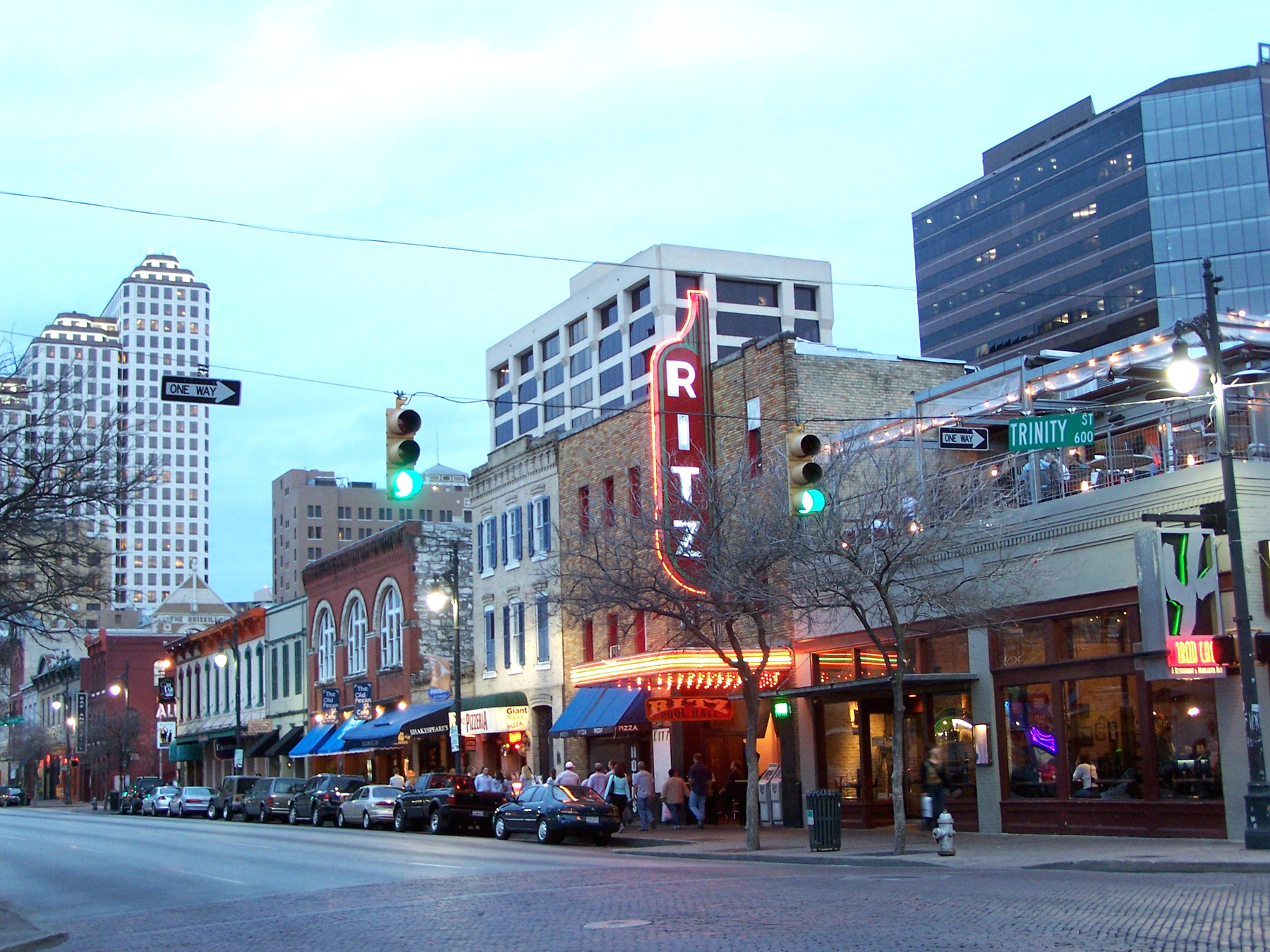
Local businesses and recreational venues like 6th Street often are next door to office buildings.

Sixth Street is a historic street and entertainment district in Downtown Austin. Sixth Street itself stretches from Mopac Expressway in Old West Austin to Interstate 35 and beyond. The western portion includes the historic West Sixth Street Bridge at Shoal Creek. The nine-block area of East Sixth Street roughly between Lavaca Street to the west and Interstate 35 to the east is recognized as the Sixth Street Historic District and was listed in the National Register of Historic Places on December 30, 1975.

The area around nearby 4th Street and 6th Street has been a major entertainment district since the 1970s. Many bars, clubs, music venues, and shopping destinations are located on E. 6th Street between Congress Avenue and Interstate 35 and many offer live music at one time or another during the week. Traffic is generally blocked on E. 6th Street and most crossroads from I-35 to Brazos Street on weekend evenings, and football home games (depending on pedestrian traffic), as well as holidays and special events to allow the crowds to walk unfettered to the many venues that line the street. E. Sixth Street plays host to a wide variety of events each year, ranging from music and film festivals (such as South by Southwest) to biker rallies (such as The Republic of Texas Biker Rally) and the Pecan Street Festival. The area of Sixth Street west of Lavaca is known as the West 6th Street District. Recently, there has been a growing movement to develop this area as an entertainment district of its own, geared toward the live music crowd. As of May 15, 2014, in response to a deadly crash during the SXSW festival and the increase of intoxicated patrons, vehicular parking between Brazos and Red River Streets is prohibited between the hours of 9 p.m. to 3 a.m. on Thursday, Friday, and Saturday evenings.

=== Rainey Street ===
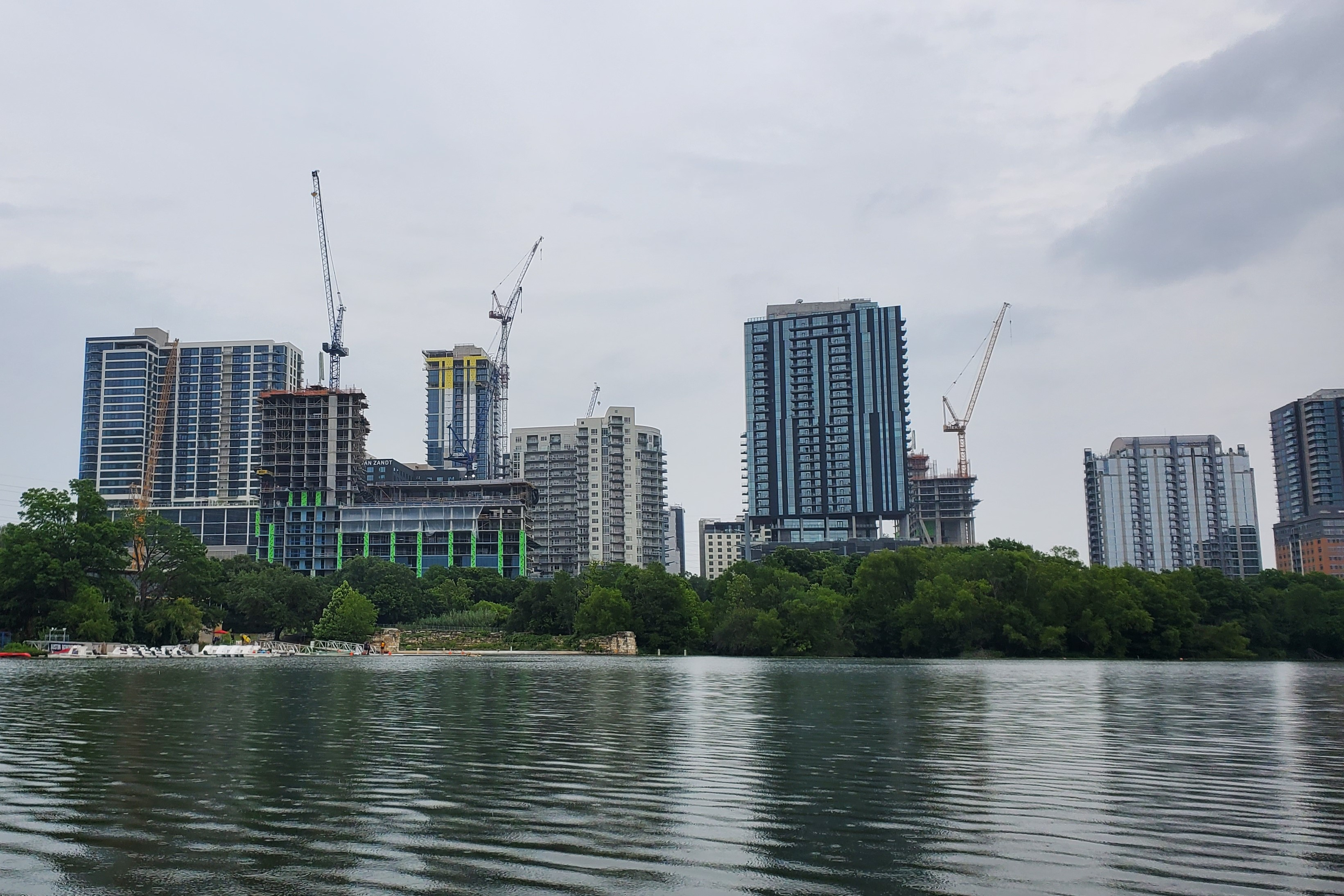
Several high-rise buildings under construction in Rainey Street in 2023, showcasing the rapid redevelopment the district has undergone.

The Rainey Street Historic District is a community positioned near Lady Bird Lake and Interstate 35 in a southeastern pocket of downtown. The situation at Rainey Street is unique in that the area was once a sleepy residential street, albeit nestled right next to downtown, was rezoned as part of Austin's central business district in 2004. The hope at the time was to incentivize development near the Austin Convention Center and the since-built Emma S. Barrientos Mexican American Cultural Center. But while grander development has stalled, bars and eateries have flocked to Rainey, since CBD zoning enables traffic-heavy cocktail bar or restaurant use without any additional zoning request. As such, old bungalows have been fixed up and turned into bars and cocktail lounges with ample backyards and porches.

=== West End/Market District ===
The West End or Market District of Austin is located in the northwest section of Downtown Austin, just north of the Seaholm District and to the west of the Warehouse District.

=== Seaholm District ===
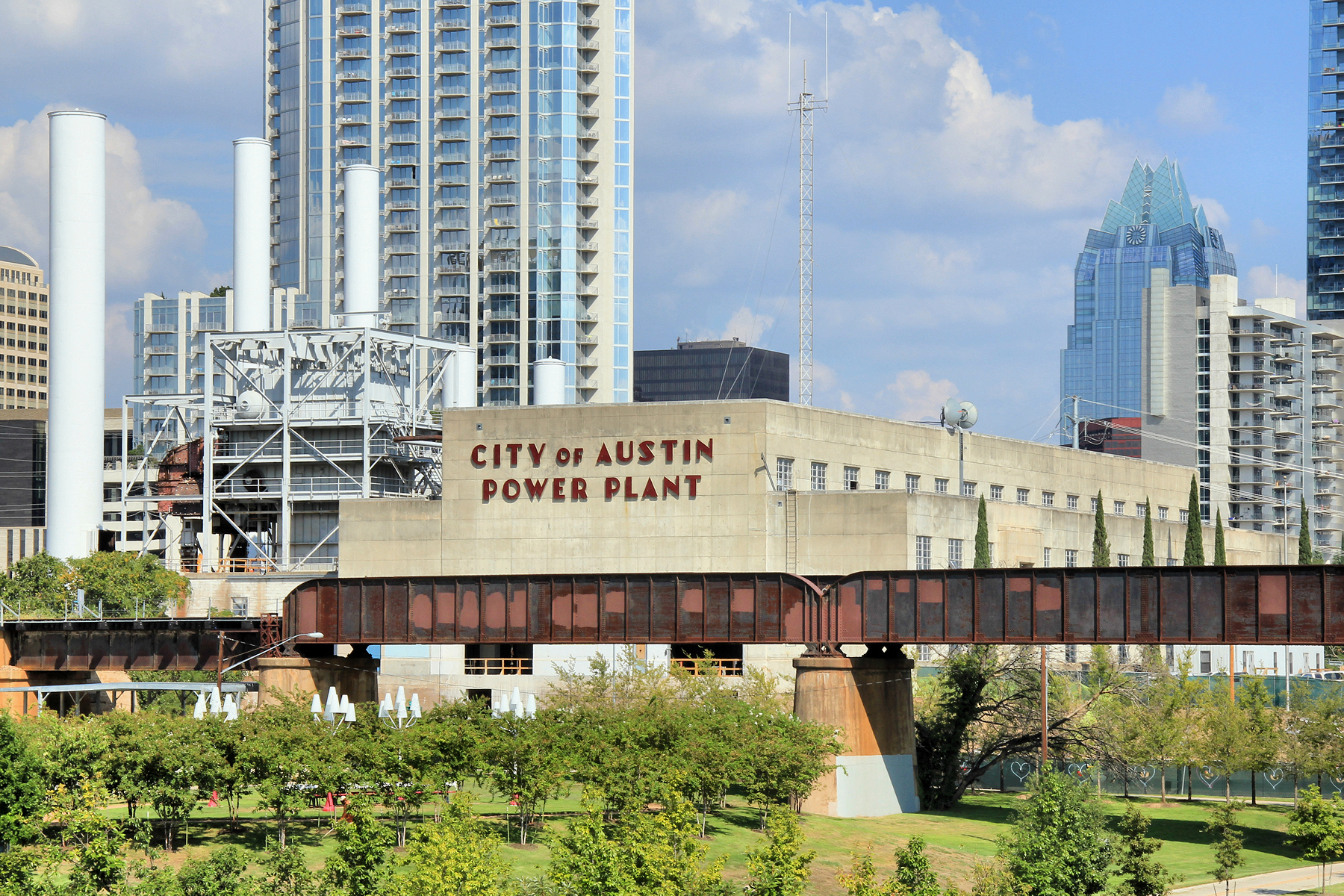
Seaholm Power Plant in 2013, viewed from the west

The Seaholm District is a formerly industrial section of southwest downtown Austin that the city has transformed into a vibrant urban neighborhood. The city of Austin has designated the area from Lady Bird Lake to 5th Street and from Lamar Boulevard to San Antonio Street as the Seaholm District. At the core of the district is the decommissioned Seaholm Power Plant, which has been redeveloped into a landmark residential and retail destination. After several years of delays and false starts due in part to a recession-based setback, the mixed-use development accommodates ten distinct retail businesses as of January 2019. Austin-based Southwest Strategies Group, the project's lead developer, announced plans to begin work on the 450,000 square feet of development to be built on the 7.8-acre site. The project is situated adjacent to the Seaholm Condominiums tower, and is intended to create a "live, work, play" urban neighborhood encompassed around a turf square for music venues, bringing many tourists and "Austinites" to the Seaholm District.

=== Bremond Block Historic District ===
The Bremond Block Historic District is a collection of eleven historic homes located in the west corner of downtown, constructed from the 1850s to 1910. The block was added to National Register of Historic Places in 1970, and is considered one of the few remaining upper-class Victorian neighborhoods of the middle to late 19th century in Texas. Six of these houses were built or expanded for members of the families of brothers Eugene and John Bremond, who were prominent in late-19th-century Austin social, merchandising, and banking circles. They are located within the square block bordered by West Seventh, West Eighth, Guadalupe, and San Antonio streets. The district also includes several houses on the west side of San Antonio and the south side of West Seventh, at least three of which were built or altered by the North family.

=== Judges Hill ===
Judges Hill is a largely residential neighborhood located north of the central business district of downtown Austin on the eastern bluff overlooking Pease Park, bordered by Rio Grande Street, 15th Street, Martin Luther King Jr. Blvd and Lamar Blvd. In 1851, Elijah Sterling Clack Robertson built the first home in present-day Judges Hill near the corner of 18th and San Gabriel. Although the house was subsequently demolished in 1966. Judge Robertson was the first among the neighborhood resident judges and attorneys who earned the area the name of Judges Hill. The area includes many historically designated properties from the late 19th century, some significant mid-century modern design, student communities and limited multi-family housing.

=== Red River Cultural District ===
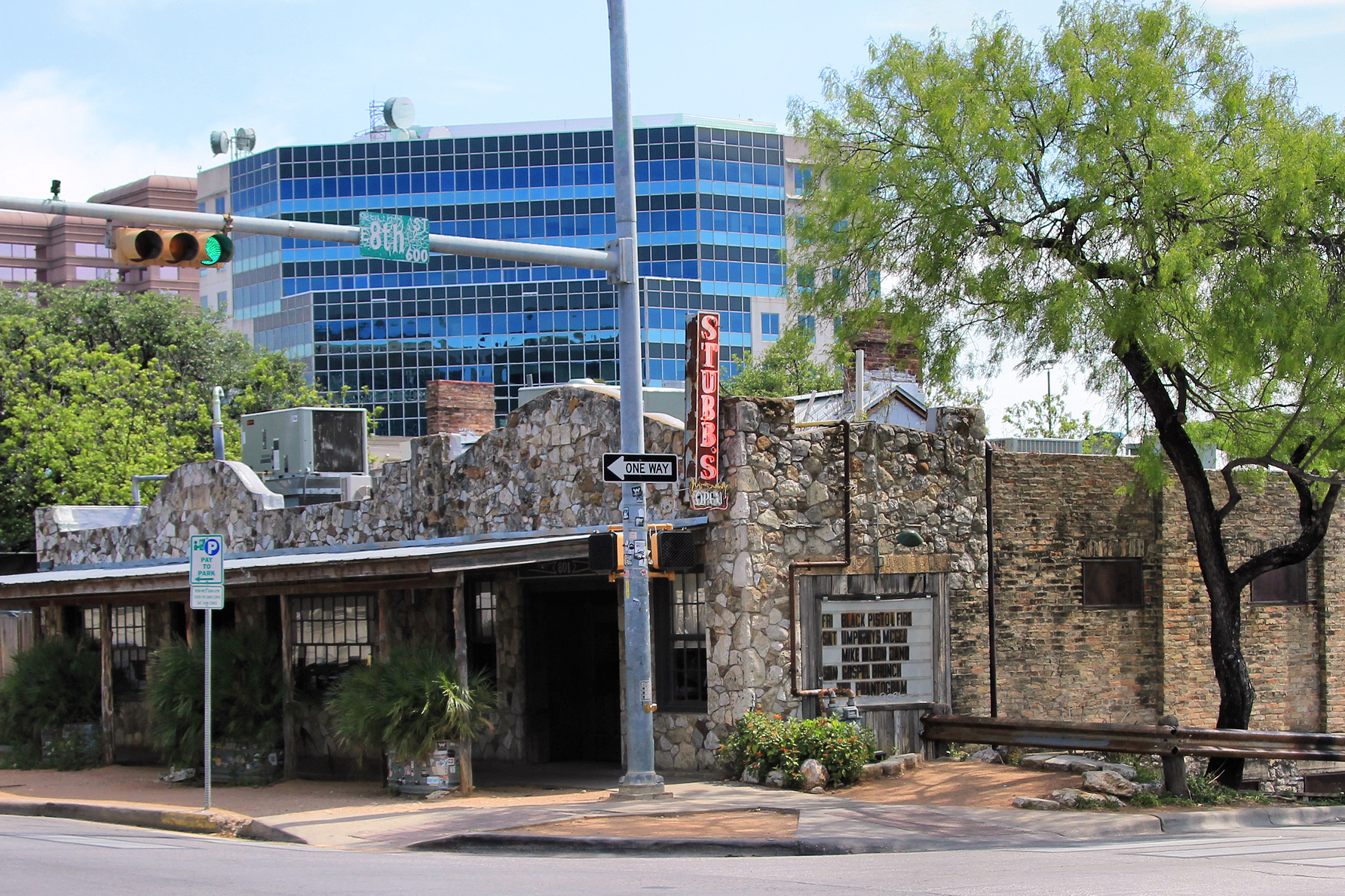
Stubb's Bar-B-Q is one of the many popular nightclubs in the Red River Cultural District.

The Red River Cultural District is an entertainment district in Downtown Austin. The Austin City Council approved a resolution creating the district on October 17, 2013. The district runs along the 600 – 900 blocks of Red River Street. The resolution also directs the city manager to address parking and loading and unloading issues in the area and to investigate the state process used to designate an area as a state cultural district.

== Government ==
=== Local government ===
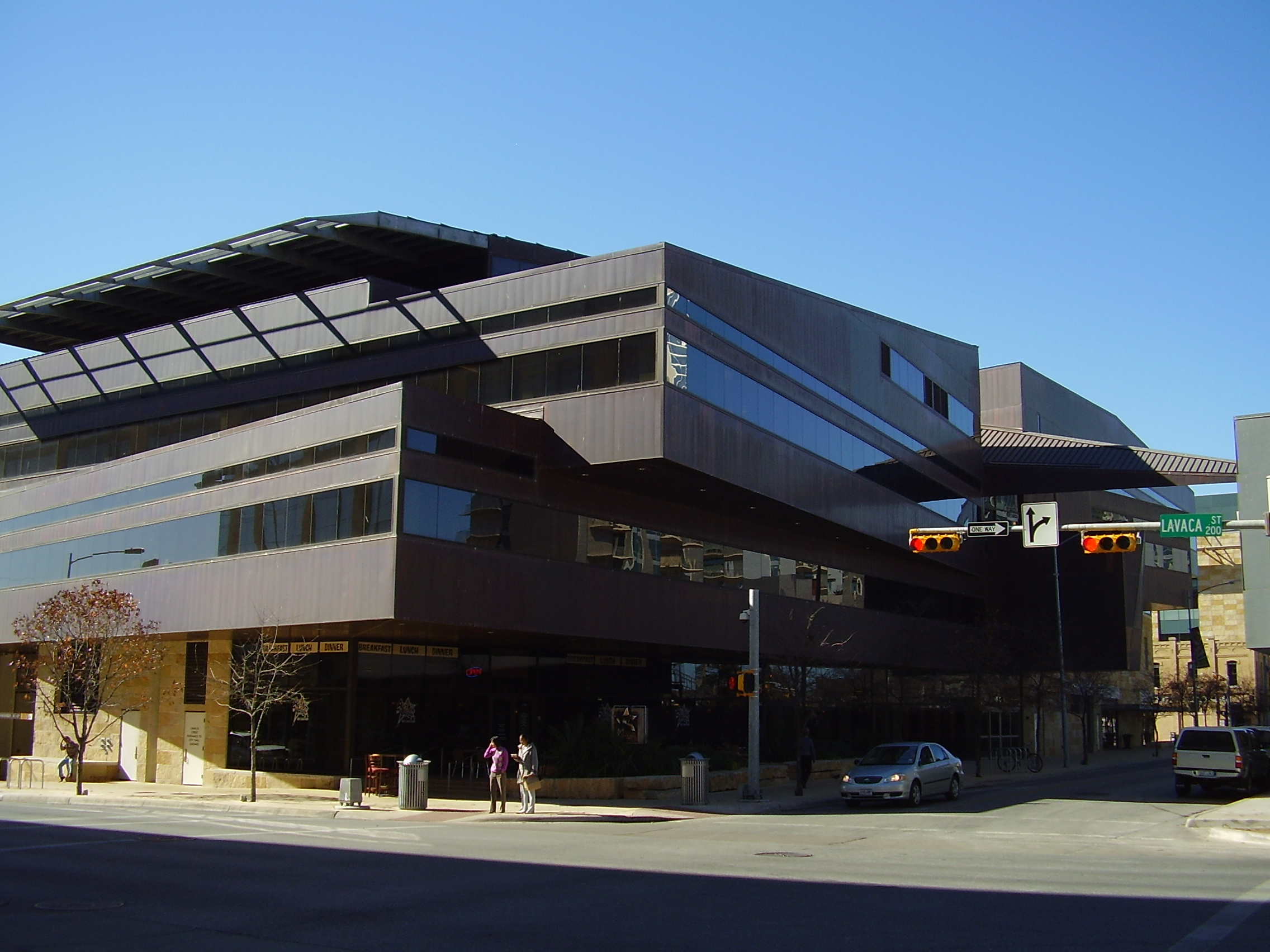
Austin City Hall

The city hall is located in Downtown Austin and is the administrative office of Austin. Originally built in 1871, the city hall was demolished and rebuilt multiple times before the current one was built in November 2004. The current city hall cost $55.6 million to build and contains a total of seven stories, of which three are underground. Within the building, city council meetings take place in the council chambers. The city council, including the mayor, are voted by Austin's residents. In 2014, Austin changed its at-large system of electing city council members to a 10–1 district-based system. The mayor serves a four-year term.

Most of Downtown Austin is located within City Council District 9, with a small portion within City Council District 1.

Austin Central Fire Station 1, 2, and 4 of the Austin Fire Department, all of which are located in downtown, provide fire protection.

=== County government ===
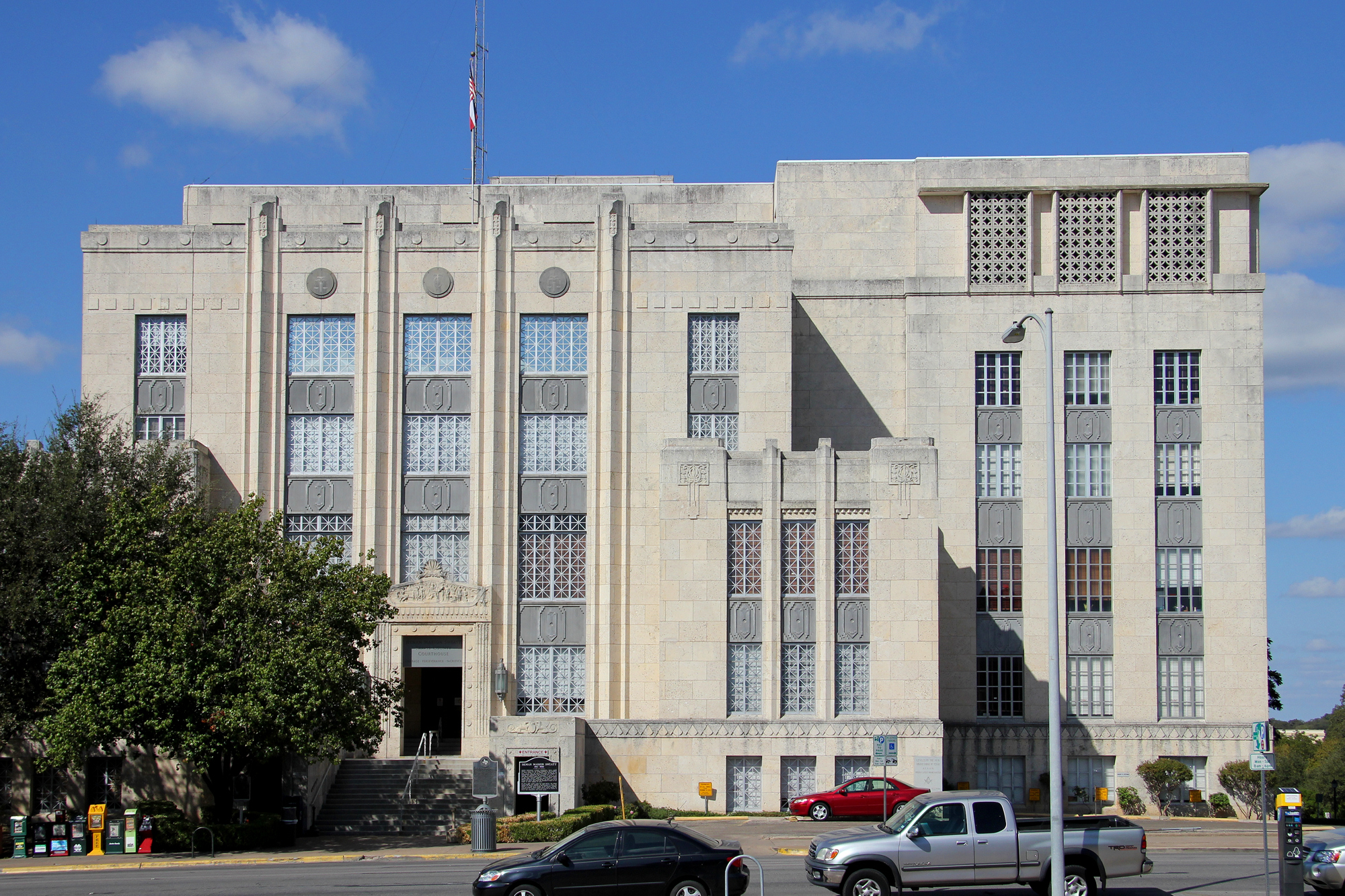
Heman Marion Sweatt Travis County Courthouse in Austin

The Travis County government offices, including the Commissioners Court, district courts, county courts, and other facilities, are located in the Heman Marion Sweatt Travis County Courthouse and other buildings in the Downtown Complex.

=== State government ===
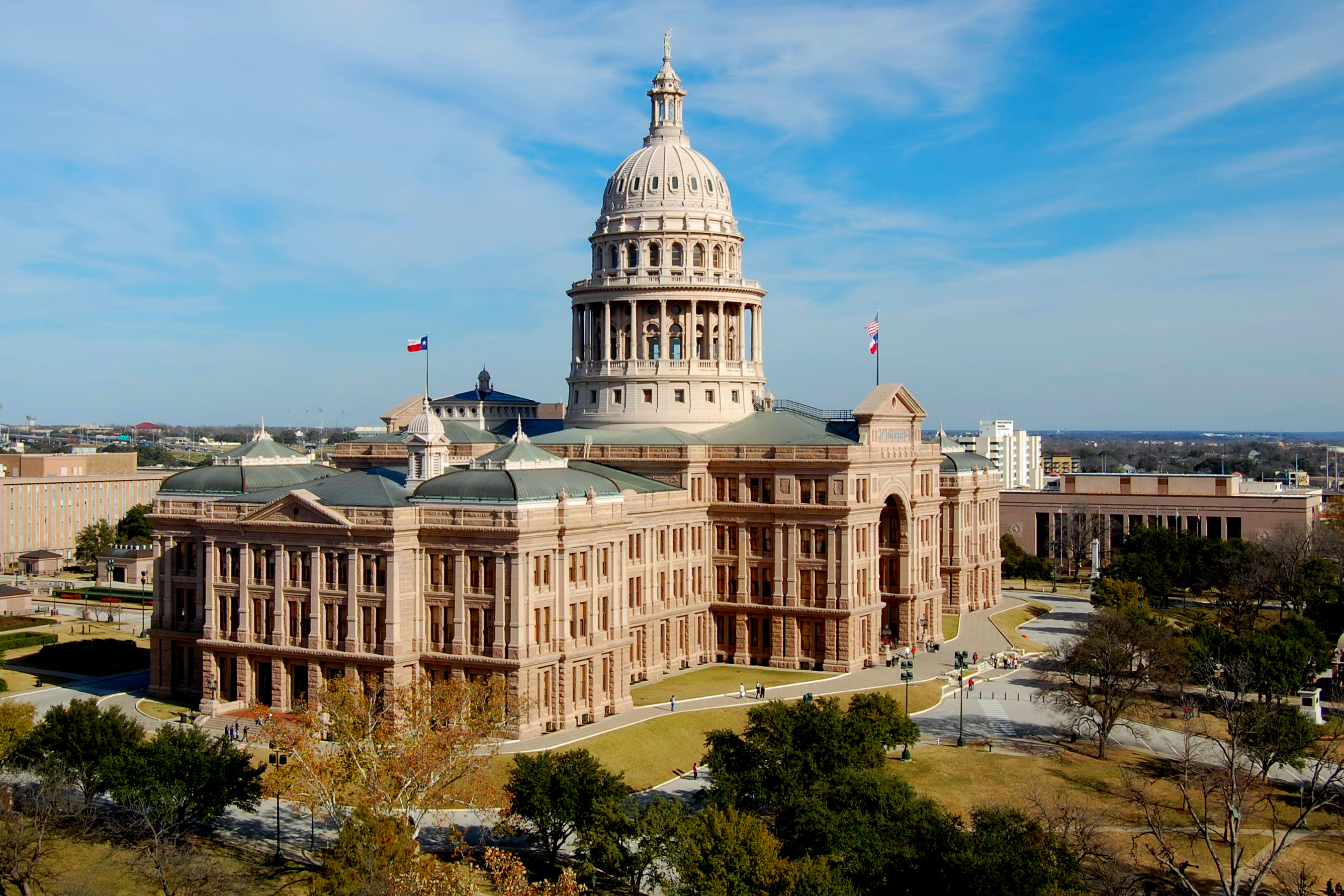
Texas State Capitol

Downtown Austin is dominated by the Texas State Capitol and associated government buildings.

The University of Texas System is headquartered in Downtown Austin. O. Henry Hall, the main headquarters, was originally a federal courthouse and post office. The Thomas J. Rusk State Office Building is located in Downtown Austin. It includes the Texas State University System headquarters.

The Texas Third Court of Appeals is located in the Price Daniel Sr. State Office Building in Downtown Austin.

The Texas Department of Public Safety operates the Region 7 Capitol office in Downtown Austin.

=== Federal government ===
The United States Courthouse for the Austin division of the United States District Court for the Western District of Texas is located in downtown Austin, adjacent to Republic Square Park.

The United States Postal Service operates the Downtown Austin Post Office in Downtown Austin.

=== Diplomatic missions ===
The Consulate General of Ireland in Austin is located in Suite 1720 of Bank of America's financial center at 515 Congress Avenue. The Consulate-General of Mexico in Austin was located in Suite 330 within the 800 Brazos Street/Brazos Place complex. It is now located west of Downtown Austin.

== Transportation ==
Capital Metropolitan Transportation Authority provides public transportation services, including bus, paratransit and since 2010, commuter rail services to Downtown Austin. The Capital MetroRail Downtown Station is located near the Austin Convention Center on Fourth Street, between Neches and Trinity; the station is outside of the Austin Convention Center.

== Economy ==
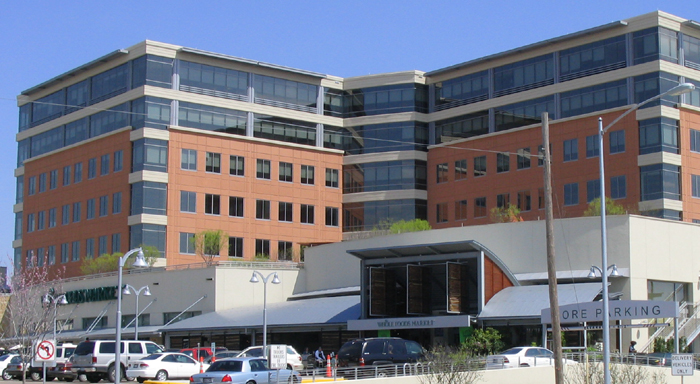
Whole Foods Market headquarters

Major employers in Downtown Austin include the corporate headquarters and flagship store of Whole Foods Market, GSD&M Idea City and one co-headquarter location of Indeed. Schlotzsky's has its headquarters in the 301 Congress Avenue building in Downtown Austin. The Texas Observer, a magazine, has its headquarters in Downtown Austin. Gowalla also has its headquarters there.

Texas Monthly has its headquarters at 816 Congress Ave. It occupies a 21,610 square feet (2,008 m^{2}) area on the 17th floor of the building. As of 2011 it has about 80 employees. The headquarters was scheduled to move to its current location in the summer of 2011. Previously the headquarters were in Suite 1600 of 701 Brazos.

The Downtown Austin Alliance is a partnership of individuals and business dedicated to promoting Downtown Austin.

== Education ==
=== Colleges and universities ===
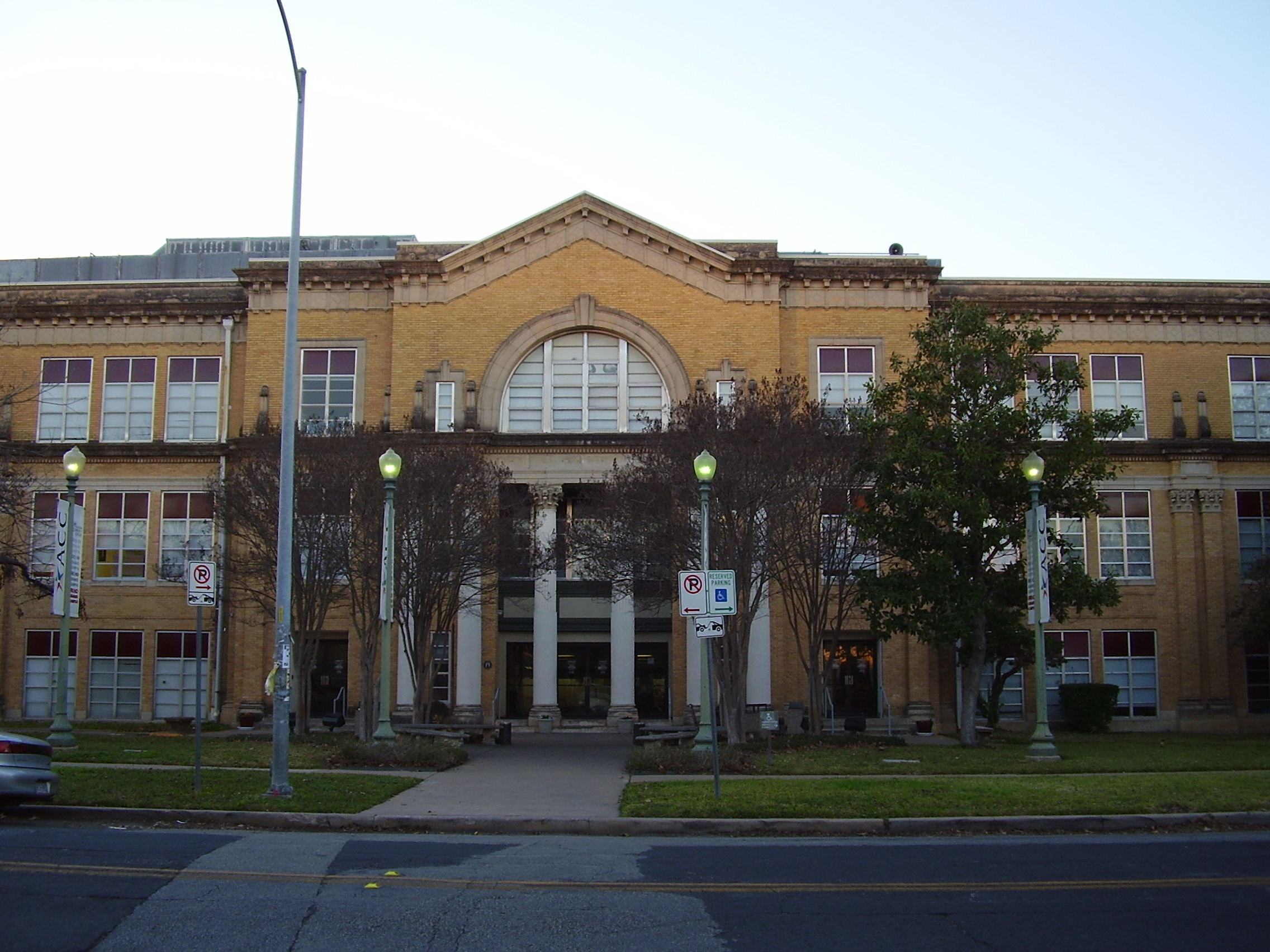
Rio Grande Campus of Austin Community College, formerly Austin High School and John T. Allan Junior High School.

Austin Community College operates the Rio Grande Campus in Downtown.

=== Primary and secondary schools ===
Austin Independent School District operates area public schools. The zoned schools are located outside of Downtown. All residents south of 15th Street are zoned to Mathews Elementary School, O. Henry Middle School, and Austin High School. Some residents north of 15th Street are zoned to Lee Elementary School, Kealing Middle School, and McCallum High School. Other residents are zoned to Bryker Woods Elementary School, O. Henry Middle School, and Austin High School.

Mathews was built in 1916. Bryker Woods and Lee were built in 1939. McCallum and O. Henry were built in 1953. The current Austin High School campus opened in 1975.

The middle and high school campus of the private school Headwaters School (formerly Khabele School) is located in Downtown Austin.

== Arts and culture ==
Downtown Austin is famous for its culture and 6th Street, a historic street and entertainment district.

=== Theaters ===
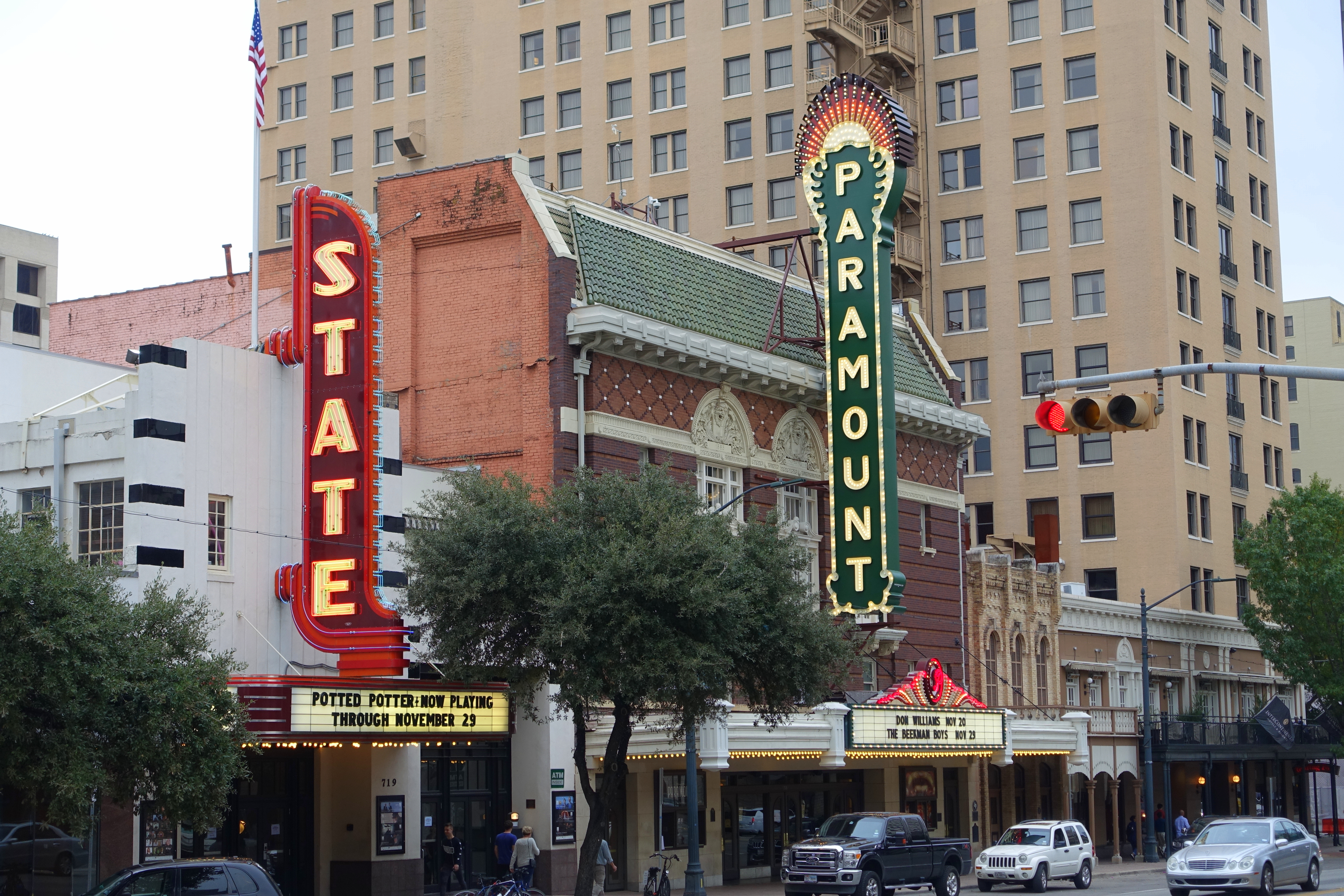
The State Theater and Paramount Theatre on Congress Avenue in Downtown Austin

The Paramount Theater is an Austin cultural icon. Built and completed in 1915, it was originally made for vaudeville. Over the years, as movies became the leading form of entertainment, the theater was remodeled with upholstered chairs and a state-of-the-art sound system. The theater would nearly close in the 1960s as people made the move from theaters to television. However, the building would be restored before closing, leading the Paramount Theater to avoid demolition. Today, the theater continues to operate, viewing popular movies.

=== Museums ===
The Contemporary Austin Jones Center is located at 700 Congress Avenue. The Contemporary Austin is Austin, Texas's primary community art museum, consisting of two primary locations and an art school.

== Media ==
Downtown Austin Magazine (DAM) features articles and guides focused on Downtown Austin, including a restaurant guide and shopping guide. The Texas Tribune has its headquarters in Downtown Austin.
