= Magic camp =

Magic camp may refer to:

== Places ==
- Tannen's Magic Shop, a camp in the United States for young magicians, held since 1974
- Fantastic Magic Camp, a camp in Texas for children, held since 1993
- Sorcerers Safari Magic Camp, a camp in Canada for young magicians, held since 1996

== Films ==
- Magic Camp, a 2012 documentary film directed by Judd Ehrlich about aspiring magicians attending Tannen's Magic Camp
- Magic Camp (film), an American comedy film about a fictional magic camp
