= Sri Atmananda Memorial School =

Sri Atmananda Memorial School refers to two schools:

- Sri Atmananda Memorial School (Malakkara, Kerala), India
- Sri Atmananda Memorial School (Austin, Texas), USA (now closed)
