= Commodore Perry Estate Hotel =

- Perry Estate / St. Mary's Academy
- U.S. National Register of Historic Places
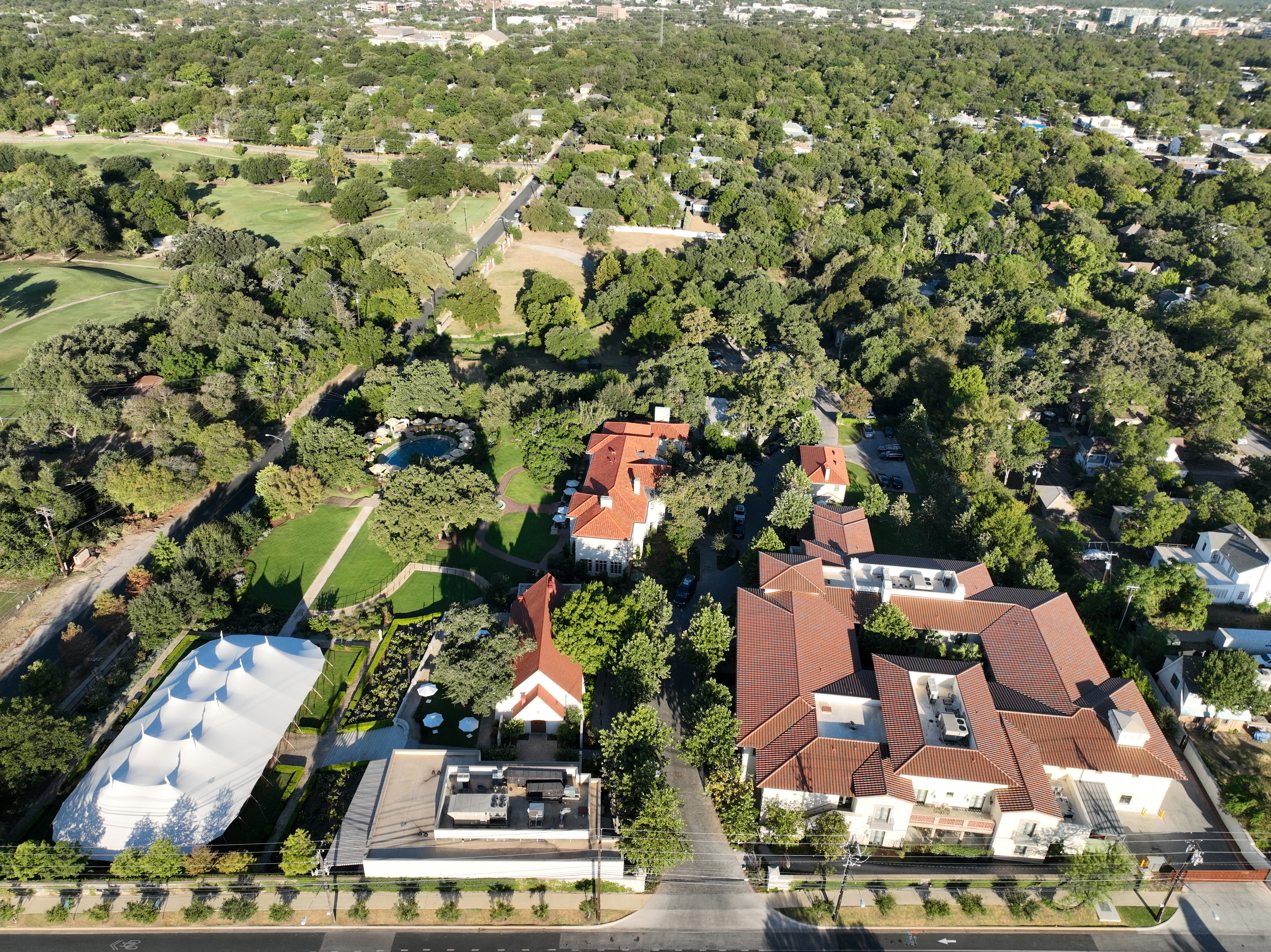
- Location: 701 E. 41st St; Austin, Texas, USA
- Coordinates: 30°18′03″N 97°43′21″W
- Built: 1928
- NRHP reference No.: 01000874
- Added to NRHP: August 8, 2001

The Commodore Perry Estate Hotel is a hotel operated by Auberge Resorts in the Hancock neighborhood of Austin, Texas.

The property on which the hotel sits was listed in the National Register of Historic Places as Perry Estate / St. Mary's Academy on August 8, 2001 and, on September 12, 2024, the hotel operating on the site received two Michelin Keys, one of only three such hotels in Texas and one of only two key hotels in Austin, Texas. The hotel additionally received four stars in 2025 in the Forbes Travel Guide.

== Property description ==
The 10-acre (40,000 m^{2}) property, located at 4100 Red River Street, originally featured guest houses, a triangular elevator, a bowling alley, and a sunken garden. The home features a Mediterranean villa style that somewhat resembles buildings at the nearby University of Texas. Waller Creek flows through the back part of the property.

== History ==
Built, originally, as the private residence of cotton entrepreneur E. H. Perry and his family in 1928, the property was sold to Herman Heep in 1944 who, in turn, sold the property to the Roman Catholic Diocese of Austin who turned the property into a school - Saint Mary's Academy, which operated on the property until 1972.

The property continued to host various schools until 2011 when Clark Lyda, who went to high school on the property when it was the Christian Academy of Austin, purchased the lot. In 2020, after years of renovations, the Commodore Perry Estate Hotel opened.

=== E. H. Perry ===
Edgar Howard (E. H.) Perry and his colleagues "were responsible for the majority of the growth and development of downtown and suburban Austin from the 1920's to the 1950's." When E. H. Perry sold the estate to Herman Heep in 1944 he moved into the Driskill Hotel, which he co-owned with others.

In 1948 Texas Governor Beauford H. Jester named E. H. Perry a Commodore in the newly reconstituted Texas Navy, although E. H. Perry had already been going by the nickname "Commodore" for some time prior to that.

In 1949 plans were presented for what would eventually become the Commodore Perry Hotel at 8th and Brazos. This hotel would continue to operate until 1974, after which the property was redeveloped as condominiums.

On November 22, 1963, President John F. Kennedy was scheduled to attend a brief reception at the Commodore Perry Hotel immediately after his planned 3:15pm arrival at Bergstrom Air Force Base, however, those plans never came to fruition due to his assassination earlier that day

The Commodore Perry Estate Hotel's Lutie's restaurant is named after E. H. Perry's wife, Lutie Perry

=== Schools ===
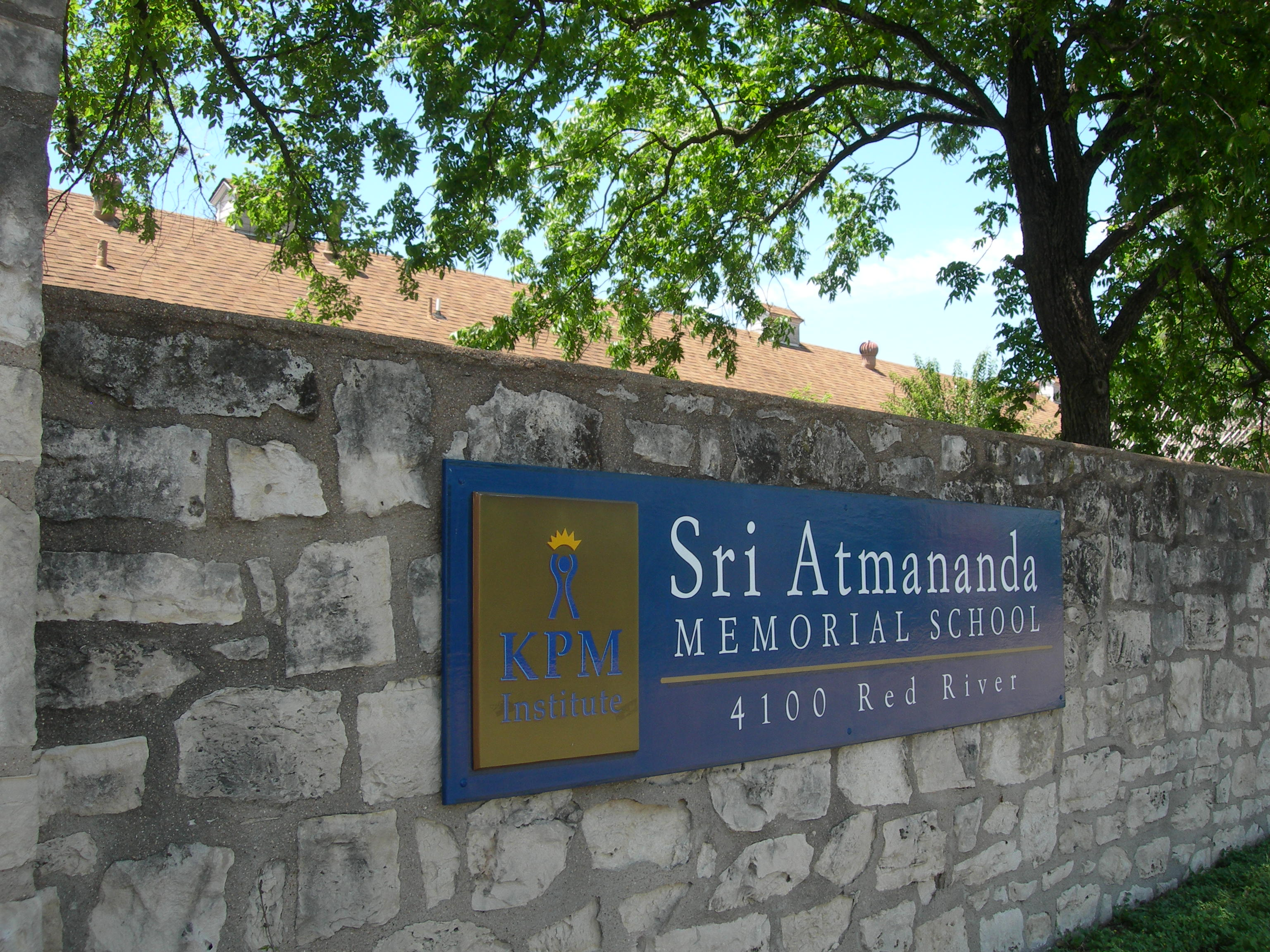
Sri Atmananda Memorial School was the last of a series of schools that were run on the property prior to it becoming a hotel

Saint Mary's Academy was the first parochial school in Austin and can trace its origins back to 1874. From 1944 to 1972 Saint Mary's Academy operated on the grounds of the former E. H. Perry Estate.

From 1972 to 1995 the school changed hands numerous times, serving variously as the Athens Montessori School, Austin Ballet Theatre, Christian Academy of Austin, Town and Country School, The Perry School, St. Francis School and Holy Cross High School.

Folk singer Nanci Griffith attended school on the property when it was Holy Cross High School together with her friend, Margaret Mary Graham, the subject of Griffith's early song "There's a Light Beyond these Woods (Mary Margaret).

From 1995 to 2011 the Sri Atmananda Memorial School operated on the property as a branch location of Sri Adwayananda Public School in Malakkara, Kerala, India.

The Sri Atmananda Memorial School hosted the Fantastic Magic Camp in the summers of 1997, 1998 and 1999
