= Suzanne Shelton Buckley =

American journalist and historian (born 1946)

- Born: Linda Suzanne Shelton; April 27, 1946 (age 80); Wichita Falls, Texas, U.S.
- Occupations: Historian; journalist
- Awards: Guggenheim Fellowship (1986)

Academic background
- Education: University of Texas at Austin
- Thesis: Divine Dancer: The Life and Work of Ruth St. Denis (1980)

Academic work
- Discipline: Dance history
- Institutions: University of Texas at Austin

Linda Suzanne Shelton Buckley (née Shelton; born April 27, 1946) is an American historian and journalist. Born in Wichita Falls, Texas, she initially worked for media outlets like the Houston Post, Texas Monthly, Dance Magazine, and KLRU, she obtained her PhD from the University of Texas at Austin (UT Austin) with a dissertation later published as a book, and later taught at UT Austin and became a 1986 Guggenheim Fellow. She later moved to India after her husband's death, and she eventually became general secretary of Alliance Educational Foundation, which operates Sri Adwayananda Public School.

== Biography ==
Linda Suzanne Shelton was born on April 27, 1946, in Wichita Falls, Texas. Her father, Glenn Elbert Shelton (1914–1990), was a local agricultural journalist for the Times Record News and KTRN (now KWFS). Her mother, Elsa Barnes Shelton (1922–1973), was an elementary school teacher based in Wichita Falls. She was a 1963 graduate of S. H. Rider High School, where she spent two years as their yearbook's editor-in-chief, before moving on to University of Texas at Austin (UT Austin), where she got her Bachelor of Arts in English in 1968 and her Master of Arts in American Studies in 1973.

In local media, she wrote for the Houston Post (1968–1970) and The Texas Observer (1970–1975), before becoming an editor and dance critic for Texas Monthly (1975–1982). and she was a dance editor for the PBS station KLRU. In national media, she worked for Dance Magazine as an editor, critic, and Texas correspondent, and she was editor for Dance Critics Association News (1980–1982) and dance history editor for Dance Research Annual (1982–1984).

In 1980, she returned to UT Austin to get her PhD in American Studies. Her doctoral dissertation, titled Divine Dancer: The Life and Work of Ruth St. Denis, was later published as a book, Divine Dancer: A Biography of Ruth St. Denis (1981). Originally an English teacher at UT Austin as of 1971, she became a lecturer at the Department of American Studies in 1982, before being promoted to assistant professor later the same year.

She was awarded the 1981 De la Torre Bueno Prize for the book. She was appointed a Council for International Exchange of Scholars Indo-American Fellow in 1983. She was appointed a Guggenheim Fellow in 1986, for "an American perspective on Indian dance".

On December 30, 1971, she married John Cantwell Buckley (c. 1928–1986), an orthopedic surgeon based in Austin and an English professor who taught history of medicine at UT Austin. They had one child, with whom she moved to India after his death, where she eventually became general secretary of Alliance Educational Foundation, a non-government organization which operates Sri Adwayananda Public School.

Her papers are held at the University of Denver Special Collections and Archives.

== Filmography ==
Year	Title	Note	Ref.
1980–1983	Panorama 90	Dance editor	
1980–1983	Art Beat	Dance editor	
