= Treaty Oak (Austin, Texas) =

Historic tree in Austin, Texas

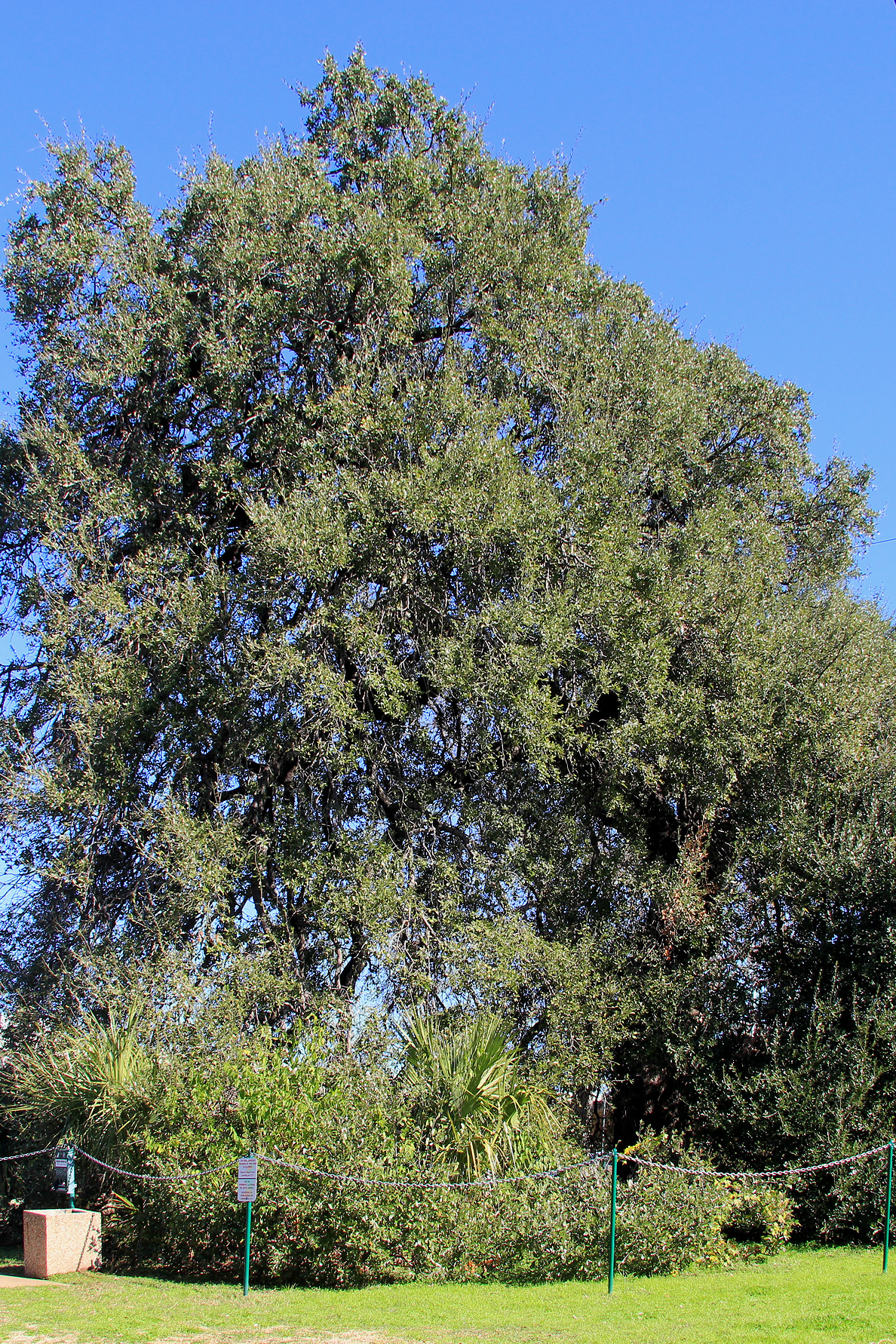
- The Treaty Oak in 2015
- Interactive map of Treaty Oak
- Species: Texas live oak (Quercus fusiformis)
- Location: West Line Historic District (Austin, Texas)
- Coordinates: 30.27130°N 97.75550°W

The Treaty Oak is a Texas live oak tree in Austin, Texas, United States. Foresters estimate the Treaty Oak to be about 500 years old. Before its vandalism in 1989, the tree's branches had a spread of 127 feet (39 m). The tree is located in Treaty Oak Park, on Baylor Street between 5th and 6th Streets, in Austin's West Line Historic District. The tree was formerly known as "Raymond's Oak" after the original land patentee, James H. Raymond, the last treasurer for the Republic of Texas and first treasurer after statehood.

== History and legends ==
=== Legends ===
The legends that surround Treaty Oak appear to have their origin in the 1920s before it was made an Austin park and was in danger of being lost. Then owner, Mrs. W.H. Caldwell, was unable to afford property taxes associated with the lots upon which the tree was located; the tree hindered her development of the lots for financial gain with which to pay taxes. As reported in the news "[Mrs. Caldwell] has paid taxes on [the lots] ... without gaining any return from her property, for the tree, with its breadth, practically covers the frontage of two lots and prevents selling them for building purposes." Treaty Oak may have been "part of an American tradition of declaring some trees special to protect them from the woodsman’s ax." That the tree was special to begin with in Texas history may have been due to confusion on history concerning Stephen F. Austin, the "father of Texas" and the City of Austin's namesake. Texas A&M Forest Service's Famous Trees of Texas categorizes Treaty Oak as "Folklore & Legends" and "Saved From the Axe", with no association with Stephen F. Austin.

According to legend, Treaty Oak is the last of the Council Oaks. As described on its historical marker, Native American "battles and important conferences have been planned, pacts signed, and feasts and religious ceremonies celebrated in its shade". Other lore says that Native American women would drink a potion made from the leaves and acorns of the Treaty Oak. The details and purpose of the potion varies from one telling to the next: it was done during the full moon; it ensured their men's success and safety in battle; it ensured fidelity; it was as a love potion. The telling of the story also varies as to the tribes associated with the tree.

The "Council Oaks" themselves are part of the legend of Treaty Oak with evidence of their existence lacking. The Austin American Statesman's database of historical newspapers going back to 1871 shows the term "Council Oaks" first appearing in the late 1920s. The number of oaks varies; some accounts simply describe a group of oaks; others cite fourteen; a news article from 1928 says five. A common explanation for the absence of the Council Oaks is they were cut down as Austin grew. But the first commercial development involving Treaty Oak was the Raymond Plateau Subdivision; the property was until then owned by the Raymonds. In 1871 a plat for Raymond Plateau was filed (the actual plat survey preceding the filing) and shows an oak at Treaty Oak's location (but no name), but not as part of a grove of oaks. In addition to the lack of evidence for the Council Oaks, the plat seems to run counter to lore that Treaty Oak was the remaining oak of a large grove at that location.

Likely the best known story associated with the tree concerns Stephen F. Austin who is reputed to have signed the first boundary line agreement between Indians and Anglo Texans under the tree. But historical proof has not been found; Stephen F. Austin died in 1836 before either Waterloo or Austin was founded.

In 1936 the Texas Centennial Historical Commission concluded the story was "unfounded romance ... without historical foundation". The Commission also concluded the "tradition probably grew out of a treaty made by Carita, Tonkawa Indian chief, and Stephen F. Austin in 1824, by which the Indians agreed to keep out of the colony." The colony referenced is San Felipe de Austin in today's Austin County, Texas, which likely over time was conflated with the current City of Austin, Travis County. That verbal agreement, and never called a "treaty" per se, was documented in a letter from Stephen F. Austin to Jose Antonio Saucedo in 1826.

Treaty Oak's Stephen F. Austin story had been called into question by historians a decade before the Texas Centennial. In 1925 then owner Mrs. W.H. Caldwell expressed skepticism about the story: "I have never made any claims that the tree was that under which Stephen F. Austin or anyone else signed treaties with the Indians ... I understand the Daughters of the Texas Republic (sic) have investigated the records and have been unable to substantiate the stories ... The first time I ever heard that my tree was the treaty oak (sic) was when a story appeared in the morning paper about two years ago ... I do not know where the information came from." The article goes on to say that the Daughters of the Republic of Texas point out an obvious problem, "Stephen F. Austin had been dead three years when the city of Austin was laid out, and that he never held any conferences with Indians as far west as Austin."

The Texas Centennial Historical Commission's conjecture the story probably grew out of meetings between Stephen F. Austin and Tonkawa Chief Carita is born out in a news article from March 16, 1923 where the author conflates events at "the colony" at San Felipe de Austin, Austin County, with the current City of Austin, Travis County. The article's anonymous author then embellishes the story beyond what is actually contained in the correspondence of Stephen F. Austin on the matter. This article didn't use the term "Treaty Oak" to refer to the tree. The Austin American Statesman's database of historical newspapers going back to 1871 shows the term "Treaty Oak" does not appear to have been used prior to 1923.

Another story holds that Sam Houston rested beneath the Treaty Oak after being deposed as Governor of Texas by the secessionist state legislature at the start of Texas's involvement in the American Civil War. Other accounts of the Treaty Oak peace treaty story like that published in The Austin American in 1935 claimed it was Sam Houston, not Stephen F. Austin, who "parleyed with the Indians for peace nearly a century ago", i.e. ca. 1825 before Houston had even arrived in Texas.

=== History ===
Treaty Oak is on property originally patented by James H. Raymond. Raymond arrived in Texas in 1839, and among other civil service was the last treasurer for the Republic of Texas and first treasurer after statehood. Raymond participated in the battles against the Ráfael Vásquez and Adrián Woll expeditions. In 1848 the State of Texas approved patents to Raymond for a number of outlots (lots outside the original city limits) that included Division Z, Outlot 11 where today's Treaty Oak is located. This was the location where James and wife Margaret (Johnston) Raymond built their homestead; today's street address of 1008 W. Sixth Street. Located just south of their homestead was today's Treaty Oak, originally known as "Raymond's Oak". As described in the NRHP application for the West Line Historic District, one of the earliest subdivisions of the outlots west of Austin was Raymond Plateau. It was platted by James and Margaret around 1871 and included the location of today's Treaty Oak. James H. Raymond died in 1897 while still living at their homestead. Margaret died in 1917. James and Margaret had no children.

In 1882 Walter H. Caldwell and wife Lou (Jones) Caldwell made their home on what is today's West Sixth on lots on which Treaty Oak is located. Walter died in 1910 with his obituary listing his address as 1009 West Sixth, that being part of the Raymond Plateau subdivision. By 1923 news articles reported his widow having difficulty paying the property taxes on their property. In 1926, Mrs. Caldwell offered the land for sale for $7,000. While local historical groups urged the Texas Legislature to buy the land, it appropriated no funds. In 1937, the City of Austin purchased the land for $1,000 and installed a plaque honoring the tree's role in the history of Texas.

In 1927 the American Forestry Association proclaimed the tree a perfect specimen of a North American tree and inducted the Treaty Oak into its Hall of Fame.

== Vandalism ==
In 1989, in a deliberate act of vandalism, the tree was poisoned with the powerful hardwood herbicide Velpar. Lab tests showed the quantity of herbicide used would have been sufficient to kill 100 trees. The incident sparked community outrage, national news reports, and a torrent of homemade "Get Well" cards from children that were displayed on the fence around the park. Texas industrialist Ross Perot wrote a blank check to fund efforts to save the tree. DuPont, the herbicide manufacturer, established a $10,000 reward to capture the poisoner. The vandal, Paul Cullen, was apprehended after reportedly bragging about poisoning the tree to cast a spell. Cullen was convicted of felony criminal mischief and sentenced to serve nine years in prison.

The intensive effort to save the Treaty Oak included applying sugar to the root zone, replacing soil around its roots, and installing a system to mist the tree with spring water. Although arborists expected the tree to die, the Treaty Oak survived. Still, almost two-thirds of the tree died, and more than half of its crown was pruned.

== Later events ==
In 1997, the Treaty Oak produced its first crop of acorns since the vandalism. City workers gathered and germinated the acorns, distributing the seedlings throughout Texas and other states. Today, the tree is a thriving, although lopsided, reminder of its once-grand form. Many Texans see the Treaty Oak as a symbol of strength and endurance. In January 2009, the Texas chapter of the International Society of Arboriculture partnered with the Austin Parks and Recreation Department to do maintenance pruning of the Treaty Oak.

== See also ==
- List of individual trees
- Treaty Oak (Jacksonville)
