= Sixth Street (Austin) =

Historic district in Austin, Texas, United States

- Former name: Pecan Street
- Owner: City of Austin
- Maintained by: Austin Transportation and Public Works
- Location: Austin, Texas, United States
- West end: Loop 1
- Major junctions: I-35
- East end: Calles Street
- North: Seventh Street
- South: Fifth Street
- Sixth Street Historic District
- U.S. National Register of Historic Places
- U.S. Historic district
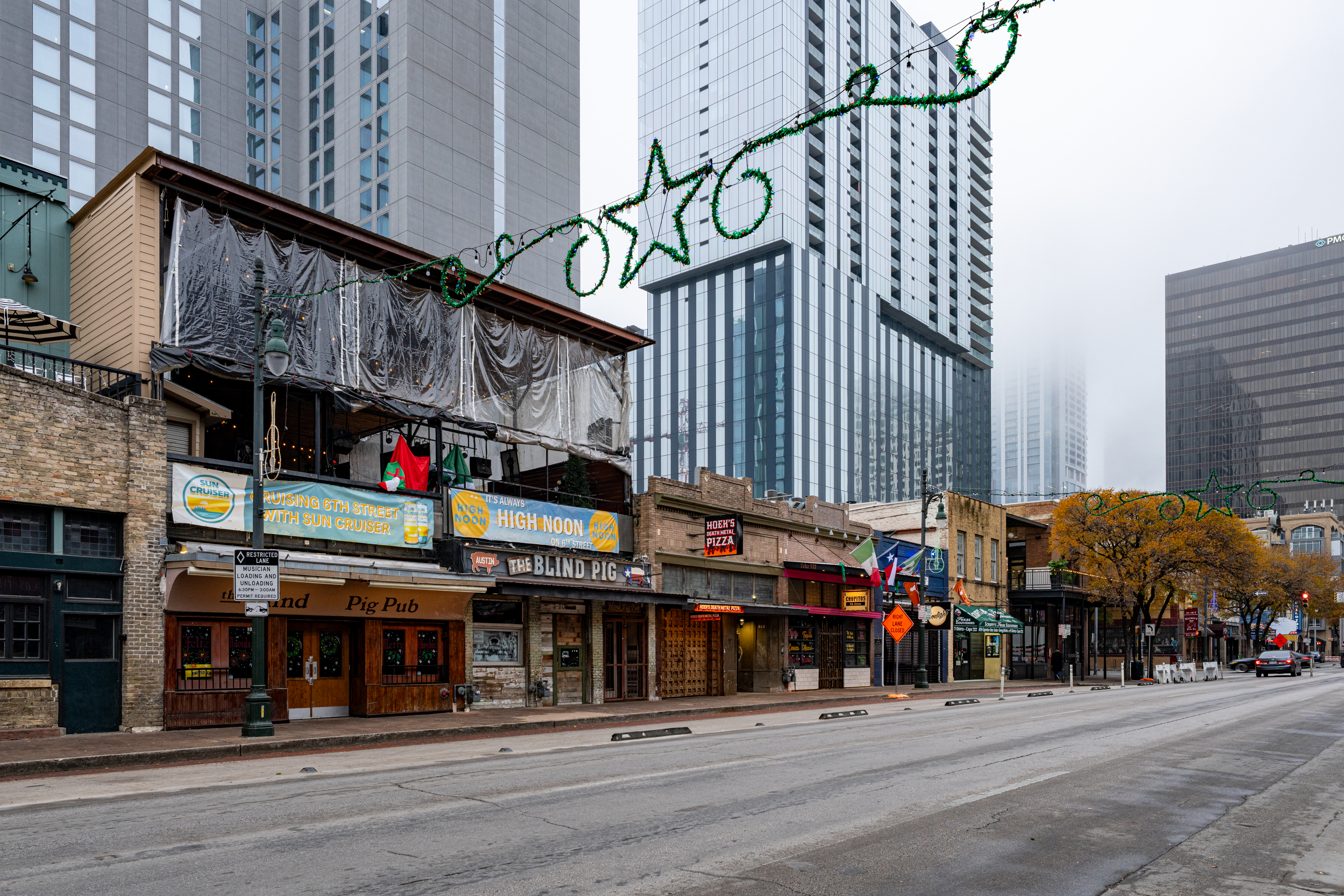
- Historic buildings lining Sixth Street (2025)
- Location: Roughly bounded by 5th, 7th, Lavaca Streets and I-35, Austin, Texas
- Coordinates: 30°16′2″N 97°44′23″W
- Built: 1839
- Architect: Multiple
- Architectural style: Early Commercial, Classical Revival, Late Victorian
- NRHP reference No.: 75002132
- Added to NRHP: December 30, 1975

Sixth Street is a historic street and entertainment district in Austin, Texas, located within the city's urban core in Downtown Austin. Sixth Street was formerly named Pecan Street under Austin's older naming convention, which had east–west streets named after trees and north–south streets named after Texas rivers (the latter convention remains in place).

The nine-block area of West Sixth Street roughly between Lavaca Street to the west and Interstate 35 to the east is recognized as the Sixth Street Historic District and was listed in the National Register of Historic Places on December 30, 1975. Developed as one of Austin's trade and commercial districts in the late 1800s, the predominant building style are two- or three-story masonry Victorian commercial architecture. Most structures in the area had already been built by the 1880s, though a few notable exceptions include the Driskill Hotel (1886), the Scarbrough Building (1910), and the Littlefield Building.

The area around nearby 4th Street and 6th Street has been a major entertainment district since the 1970s. Many bars, clubs, music venues, and shopping destinations are located on West 6th Street between Congress Avenue and Interstate 35, and many offer live music at one time or another during the week. Traffic is generally blocked on East 6th Street and most crossroads from I-35 to Brazos Street on weekend evenings, and football home games (depending on pedestrian traffic), as well as holidays and special events, to allow crowds to walk to the many venues that line the street.

East Sixth Street (known locally as Dirty Sixth) plays host to a wide variety of events each year, ranging from music and film festivals (such as South by Southwest) to biker rallies (such as The Republic of Texas Biker Rally) and the Pecan Street Festival.

The area of Sixth Street west of Lavaca is known as the West 6th Street District. Recently, a movement has been growing to develop this area as an entertainment district of its own, geared toward the live-music crowd.

== History ==
Austin was planned on a 15-block grid plan developed by Edwin Waller that was bisected by Congress Avenue running north–south. The Bastrop Highway linking the town to earlier settlements in East Texas was charted in 1839 and chose the route into Austin along Pecan Street. The stagecoach followed this route when it arrived in Austin in 1840, and used the Bullock Hotel at the northwest corner of Pecan and Congress as the stage stop. The Bullock, built in 1839 by Richard Bullock, was a complex of log building which served as the quasiformal and informal meeting place in Austin for several years. That particular intersection quickly became the focal point of town life.

The town grew like a cross up and down Congress and Pecan. Pecan had an obvious advantage for development. The street was far enough from the river to escape flooding, which occasionally spread as far as Cypress Street (3rd Street), and it was the last east–west street flat enough for wagons and pedestrians to travel comfortably. Following an explosive growth in town population between 1850 and 1860, Pecan soon contained not only log and frame houses but was also lined with wagon yards, livery stables, and saloons to meet the needs of travelers. Austin's first bridge was built to carry Pecan Street across Shoal Creek in 1865, though the narrow iron footbridge, built by the United States Army, could not carry wagon traffic.

While the Civil War interrupted Sixth Street's growth in the 1860s, the following years were the height of Sixth Street's importance as a commercial center. The arrival of the railroad in 1871 was very much to Sixth Street's benefit, as some of Austin's most prestigious business enterprises were located here to be near the railroad depot. Lots along the street were in great demand, and fine two- and three-story limestone Victorian commercial structures began to line the streets where one-story frame buildings or vacant lots had been. In 1887, a new, larger bridge across Shoal Creek was built to match the full 80-foot (24 m) width of Sixth Street and permit wagons to cross; this West Sixth Street Bridge is still in use today and has since been added to the National Register of Historic Places.

During the late 1880s, however, Congress Avenue began to pre-empt Sixth Street as the most fashionable shopping destination in the city. The new Texas State Capitol was being built at the head of Congress and most businesses catering to city-dwellers and/or a state government clientele moved to a Congress location. Sixth Street, though, continued to function as a site for offices, warehouses, and showrooms of businesses using the railroad, as well as to businesses catering to farmers or other travelers. In 1886, the four-story Driskill Hotel was completed at 122 E. 6th Street. Called "the finest hotel south of St. Louis", the hotel was built in a Romanesque Revival style by Jesse Driskill, a cattleman who spent his fortune constructing it.

The Scarbrough and Hicks department store, founded on the southwest corner of 6th and Congress in 1893, decided to remain in this same location in 1909 when it undertook the construction of Austin's first modern skyscraper, the Scarbrough Building, which is an eight-story brick building in the Commercial style. George Littlefield chose the northeast corner of that intersection in 1911 for a 9-story brick and limestone building to be built to house his American Bank.

A biracial character was evident along Sixth Street during this period of development, although it became more pronounced in the 1890s and early 1900s. For example, a black physician had an office in the 300 block of East Sixth, and several businesses on the north side of the 400 and 500 blocks were operated by blacks and catered to Austin's black community. By the early 20th century, racial and ethnic diversity had become one of Sixth Street's most striking characteristics. Lebanese businesses also began to appear on 6th Street in the 1890s. One of the first Lebanese immigrants to Austin, Cater Joseph, opened a confectionery on Congress in the 1880s. The Joseph family still maintains a business on East 6th Street, as do several other Lebanese and Syrian families who founded businesses there in the early 20th century. By 1940, businesses on 6th Street were owned by blacks, Jewish, German, Chinese, and Mexican-Americans, as well.

A steady erosion of the commercial importance of the East 6th Street area occurred in the 1940s and particularly accelerated after World War II. A proliferation of second-hand stores, chain and discount stores catered to a lower-income clientele, followed by an increasing number of vacated buildings. A skid-row atmosphere was fostered in the 1950s and 1960s by the multiplying number of pawn shops, loan companies, and bars in the area. However, a number of owner-operated businesses kept the area alive for commercial activity.

Beginning in the late 1960s and early 1970s, Sixth Street's revival increasingly centered on entertainment. As Austin's live music reputation grew, venues and clubs such as Antone's, Black Cat, and the Cannibal Club helped establish the street as a focus of the city's music and nightlife culture; by the 1980s and 1990s, Sixth Street had become firmly established as Austin's primary entertainment district. The district's performance history also included comedy and theater: Esther's Follies, a vaudeville-style comedy theater that began in 1977, became a long-running Sixth Street venue, and actors and authors Joe Sears and Jaston Williams developed the original version of Greater Tuna at TransAct, a feminist theater on East Sixth Street, before the play premiered there in 1981.

One of the last residents on Sixth Street was local architect David Graeber. Graeber purchased the building at 410 E. 6th Street and made it his family's residence until he died in 2010. The building is notable as the last building on Sixth Street to be used exclusively as a primary residence. The building's interior was modern for the time, including an indoor swimming pool, and substantial sound mitigation.

The Ritz, a historic theater, opened its doors on 320 East 6th Street in 1929. Throughout its history, the Ritz was used as a movie theater, music hall, club, comedy house, and more. It reopened after renovations in fall 2007 as the new downtown location for Alamo Drafthouse. On March 20, 2007, Alamo Drafthouse Cinema announced that they would be relocating their downtown cinema, which was the original theater opened in 1997, to the Ritz. They began construction on April 1, 2007, to revive the Ritz as a movie theater. The theater was subsequently closed in 2021 after Alamo Drafthouse filed for Chapter 11 bankruptcy. In March 2023, comedian Joe Rogan repurposed the theater as The Comedy Mothership, a comedy club.

Plans to make the Sixth Street district vehicle free were considered prior to a SXSW 2014 drunk driving incident where several pedestrians were struck. In December 2024, the city began a pilot to restore vehicular access to the entertainment district and, as of 2026, has proposed plans to redesign the street to better prioritize pedestrian access.

During the early midnight hours on March 2, 2026, a mass shooting took place at Buford's Backyard Beer Garden, killing three people and injuring 15 others. The perpetrator was also killed at the scene by responding police officers.

== Pecan Street Festival ==
Until the 1970s, Sixth Street was in decline and downtown was scarcely populated, with abandoned buildings scattered about. A pioneering group of Austinites, including Dr. Emma Lou Linn, known as the Old Pecan Street Association, was instrumental in reclaiming the downtown space and starting renovation of the old buildings. The association needed adequate funding for restoration costs and bringing a street fair to life was a solution to their problems.

In 1978, the Pecan Street Festival was started and included local food and art vendors along with bands from the surrounding area, establishing a community event for cultural preservation and creativity. Due to the festival's positive turnout, the celebration became a biannual spring and fall tradition, honoring 6th Street's original name, Pecan Street. In the past, the event has attracted more than 300,000 people, generating an economic impact around $43 million in 2010.

In 2025 the Pecan Street Festival moved to the Hill Country Galleria in Bee Cave, Texas with the following justification given:

Due to the recent restructuring of Historic Sixth Street and public safety concerns, the May 2025 Pecan Fest will take place at Hill Country Galleria. Enjoy free parking and free admission, a clean and safe environment, and all the amenities of the Pecan Street Festival you know and love.

— Pecan Street Festival organizers, KTBC (TV)

== National Register of Historic Places listings ==
	Name on the Register	Image	Date listed	Location	City or town	Description
1	U.S. Post Office and Federal Building	U.S. Post Office and Federal Building	August 25, 1970 (Ref. # missing)	126 W. 6th St. 30°16′07″N 97°44′36″W	Austin	
2	Richmond Kelley Smoot House	Richmond Kelley Smoot House	August 12, 1982 (Ref. # missing)	1316 W. 6th St. 30°16′28″N 97°45′35″W	Austin	
3	West Sixth Street Bridge at Shoal Creek	West Sixth Street Bridge at Shoal Creek	August 18, 2015 (Ref. # missing)	800 block W. 6th St. 30°16′14″N 97°45′05″W	Austin	
