= West Sixth Street Bridge =

Historic bridge in Austin, Texas

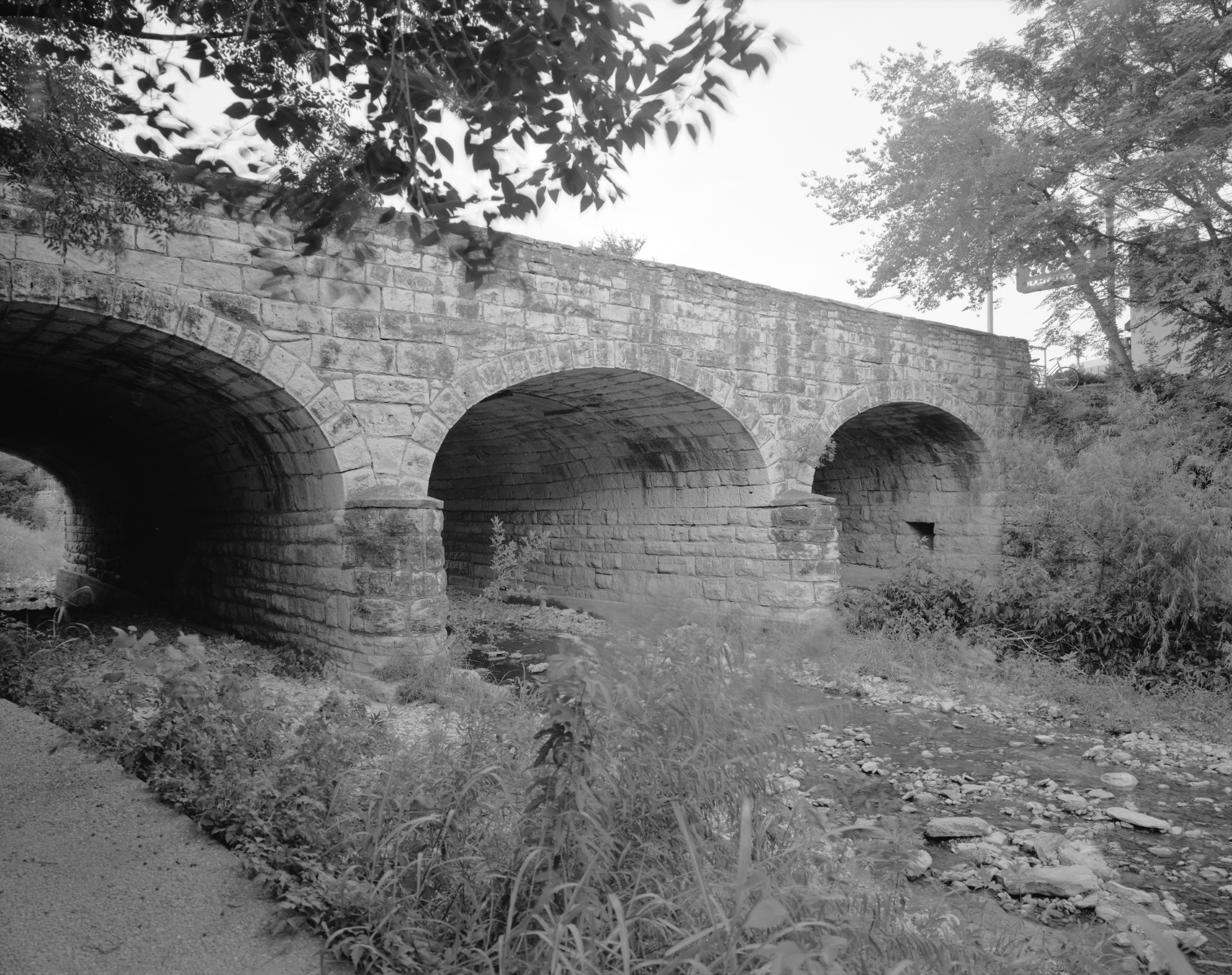
- Southwest view in the Historic American Engineering Record
- Coordinates: 30°16′N 97°45′W
- Carries: West Sixth Street
- Crosses: Shoal Creek
- Locale: Austin, Texas; United States
- Owner: City of Austin
- ID number: 142270B00018085

Characteristics
- Design: Arch bridge
- Material: Limestone
- Total length: 90 feet (27 m)
- Width: 80 feet (24 m)
- Longest span: 24 feet (7.3 m)
- No. of spans: 3
- Piers in water: 2
- No. of lanes: 4

History
- Construction start: March 1887
- Construction cost: $6,126.20
- Opened: July 1887
- West Sixth Street Bridge at Shoal Creek
- U.S. National Register of Historic Places
- Location within Texas Location within the United States
- Coordinates: 30°16′14″N 97°45′5″W
- Area: less than one acre
- NRHP reference No.: 14000499
- Added to NRHP: August 18, 2014

The West Sixth Street Bridge is a historic stone arch bridge in downtown Austin, Texas. Built in 1887, the bridge is one of the state's oldest masonry arch bridges. It is located at the site of the first bridge in Austin, carrying Sixth Street across Shoal Creek to link the western and central parts of the old city. The bridge was added to the National Register of Historic Places in 2014.

== History ==
The first bridge within the Austin city limits was built across Shoal Creek at West Sixth Street (then known as "Pecan Street") in 1865. This first bridge, built by the United States Army, was a narrow iron footbridge and could not carry wagon traffic. As the capital city expanded, development west of Shoal Creek increased, and demand for a reliable vehicular crossing grew. At the Austin City Council meeting of January 3, 1887, council instructed the city engineer to estimate the cost of a new, larger bridge at Pecan Street that would match the full 80-foot (24 m) width of the street and permit wagons to cross.

On March 21, 1887, city council allocated $6,126.20 (equivalent to $220,000 in 2025) for the construction of a permanent double-arch stone bridge to span the creek; in fact, the bridge was ultimately built with three arches. Construction was completed and the bridge opened to traffic in July 1887, giving wagons, automobiles and streetcars access to the western suburbs that would become the city's West Line Historic District. Since its completion, the bridge has required repairs on numerous occasions (usually due to damage from flooding on Shoal Creek), but the overall design is not believed to have been significantly altered.

Today, the bridge still carries West Sixth Street across Shoal Creek and supports substantial pedestrian and vehicular traffic daily. On August 18, 2014, the structure was added to the National Register of Historic Places in recognition of its significance as a durable work of civil engineering using local materials and a manifestation of nineteenth-century urban planning in Texas's growing capital city. The bridge is also notable for having replaced an iron truss bridge at a time when short-span masonry bridges were commonly being replaced by manufactured trusses.

== Design ==
The West Sixth Street Bridge is a closed-spandrel deck arch bridge built of local limestone. It is 90 feet (27 m) long and 80 feet (24 m) wide, its unusual width reflecting that of Pecan Street as established by Edwin Waller's original 1839 Austin city plan. Today the structure carries a concrete roadway surfaced in asphalt concrete, bearing four roadway lanes, along with parallel parking spaces and sidewalks on both sides.

The bridge spans Shoal Creek with a series of three voussoir arches, each 24 feet (7.3 m) wide at the base. Two central piers, each 4 feet (1.2 m) thick, stand directly in the creek bed on stone footings resting on bedrock. The stonework is of irregularly shaped rusticated blocks, which rise to form a parapet along the bridge's south edge; it is speculated that a matching parapet may have originally stood along the north side, but today the north edge is topped by a concrete curb and a metal guard rail on wooden posts. A concrete footpath runs parallel to the creek bed beneath the west half of the bridge's west arch.

== See also ==
- List of bridges on the National Register of Historic Places in Texas
- List of bridges documented by the Historic American Engineering Record in Texas
- National Register of Historic Places listings in Travis County, Texas
