= West Line Historic District (Austin, Texas) =

Historic district in Texas, United States

- U.S. National Register of Historic Places
- U.S. Historic district
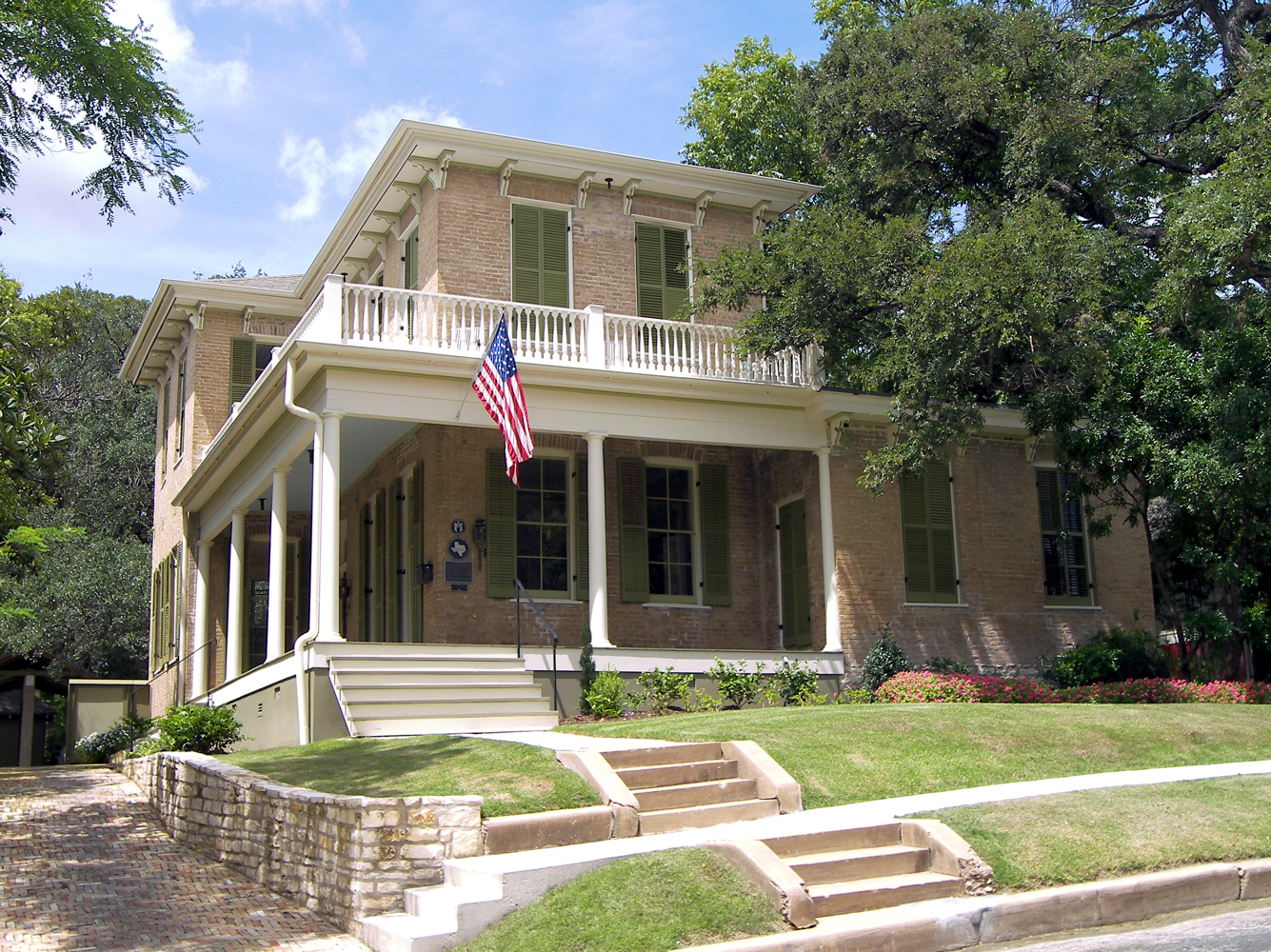
- The A. J. Jernigan House, also known as Las Ventanas, is one of the historic houses in the district.
- Location: Austin, Texas
- Coordinates: 30°15′49″N 97°46′36″W
- Area: 6,500 acres (2,600 ha)
- Built: 1871
- Architectural style: Late 19th And 20th Century Revivals
- NRHP reference No.: 05001166
- Added to NRHP: October 12, 2005

The West Line Historic District is a residential community in central Austin, Texas, United States. The district encompasses an approximately 90-block tract of land located west of downtown. Bounded by Baylor Street to the east, Fifth Street to the south, Thirteenth Street to the north and Texas State Highway Loop 1 to the west. It is located south of the Old West Austin Historic District and southeast of the Clarksville Historic District.

The district comprises more than twenty-five subdivisions platted between 1871 and 1948, out of the George W. Spear League and Division Z of the government lands west of the original city center. Early settlement in the area consisted of expansive estates, later subdivided in response to the city's burgeoning population. After the 1887 construction of the West Sixth Street Bridge over Shoal Creek, the West Sixth Street streetcar line, commonly referred to as the West Line, extended into the district from downtown and facilitated the development of suburban tracts. Due to the piecemeal development and hilly topography of the area, the streets form an irregular rectilinear grid. A number of notable nineteenth-century residences and institutional buildings exist throughout the district, but the preponderance of resources consist of Craftsman and Classical Revival-influenced bungalows built during the height of the area's development from the 1910s-1930s. In keeping with the original developers' intentions, the historic district maintains strong residential characteristics.

The area was added to the National Register of Historic Places in 2005. It includes the neighborhoods of Raymond Heights, Raymond Plateau and Shelley Heights.
