= Fantastic Magic Camp =

Summer day camp for children in Austin, Texas

Fantastic Magic Camp is a summer day camp for children located in Austin, Texas. Founded in 1993 by two Austin-area magicians, The Fantastic Kent Cummins, and Peter the Adequate, the camp teaches magic, juggling, puppetry, and other variety arts.

== History ==
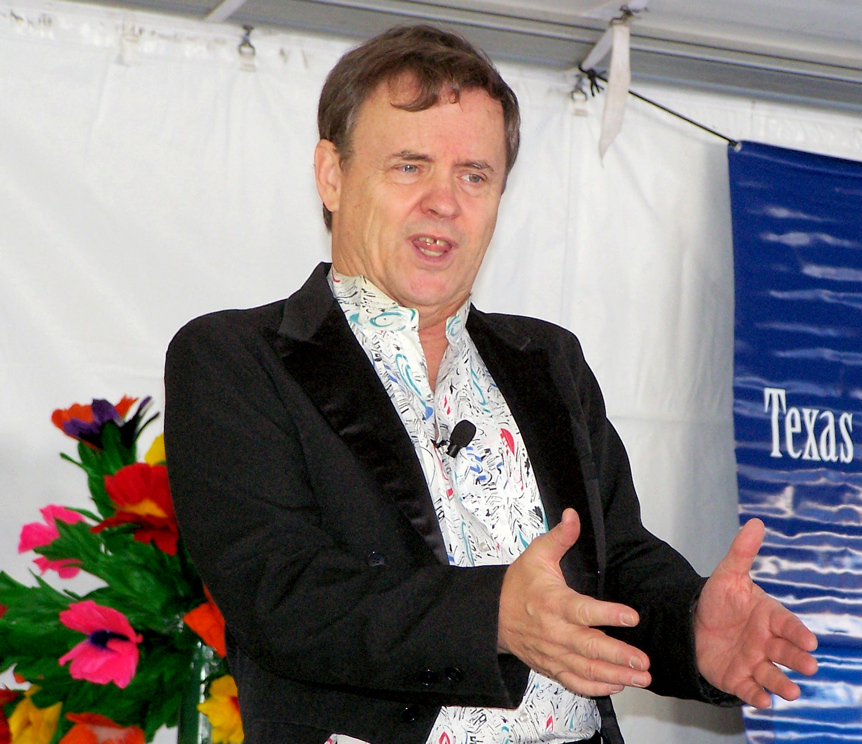
Kent Cummins in 2006.

Magic Camp was founded in 1993 by both professional magicians in the Austin area at the time, as Kent's "Magic Hotline" personal business. In January 2007, Kent relinquished direct personal control to a board of directors and "The Kent Cummins Magic Camp" incorporated as a Texas Non-Profit Organization, receiving IRS 501(c)(3) status later that year. Magic Camp continued as a non-profit for four years until the end of 2010, when it gave up its 501(c)(3) status and re-incorporated with a new board of directors as "Magic Camp USA, LLC" and "The Kent Cummins Magic Camp" was renamed as "Fantastic Magic Camp."

== Local involvement ==
The Fantastic Magic Camp maintains an active presence in the Austin magic scene. Recently, the camp provided a "day care" camp for attendees of the Texas Association of Magicians' 2010 convention, held in Austin, a booth at the first annual Austin Street Magic Festival, in addition to providing volunteers to assist with both events. Volunteers from the magic camp regularly assist with the Society of American Magicians' Ring 206's annual magic auction. In 2011, the magic camp assisted with the inaugural production of Doc Seaton's Magic Sideshow, a part of Austin's Pecan Street Festival. Additionally, the magic camp can be found at a variety of family-friendly events in the Austin area, such as Waterloo Park's 5th annual Ice Cream Festival. The Fantastic Magic Camp has been praised widely throughout the Austin area, being recognized in news networks such as CBS, and being listed in many summer camp travel guides for Austin.

== Inclusion ==
The Fantastic Magic Camp is a fully inclusive camp, accepting any and all children regardless of special needs. Over the years, the Magic Camp has partnered with organizations such as Austin Travis County Integral Care, the Austin Police Department's Camp Apple, Easter Seals and Austin's Pecan Street Festival to bring the Magic Camp experience to the children of underprivileged communities. The camp has also had a sponsorship program, where families can pay extra in order to potentially allow children who are underprivileged to attend the Fantastic Magic Camp.

== Youth Leadership Academy (Formerly Youth Leadership Training Academy) ==
The Fantastic Magic Camp's counselors are exclusively former campers who elected to participate in the magic camp's internship program and attend its "Youth Leader Training Academy." The camp's staff are exclusively former team members who completed five years in the Youth Leader Training Academy. An invitation to participate in the Youth Leader Training Academy is extended to each camper once they reach 13 years of age. In 2025, this program would be shortened to the Youth Leadership Academy.

== Awards ==
- Winner of "Small Business of the Year" from BiGAUSTIN's Creative Business Awards in 2004
- Winner of "Best Summer Camp" category of the Austin Chronicle's "Best of Austin 2010" awards.
- Winner of "Most Uniquely Austin" category of Austin, Texas Chamber of Commerce's 2012 business awards.
- Winner of "Best of 2020" from Discover Magic
