= Lundberg Bakery (Austin, Texas) =

Historic building in Austin, Texas, U.S.

- Old Bakery
- U.S. National Register of Historic Places
- Recorded Texas Historic Landmark
- Texas State Antiquities Landmark
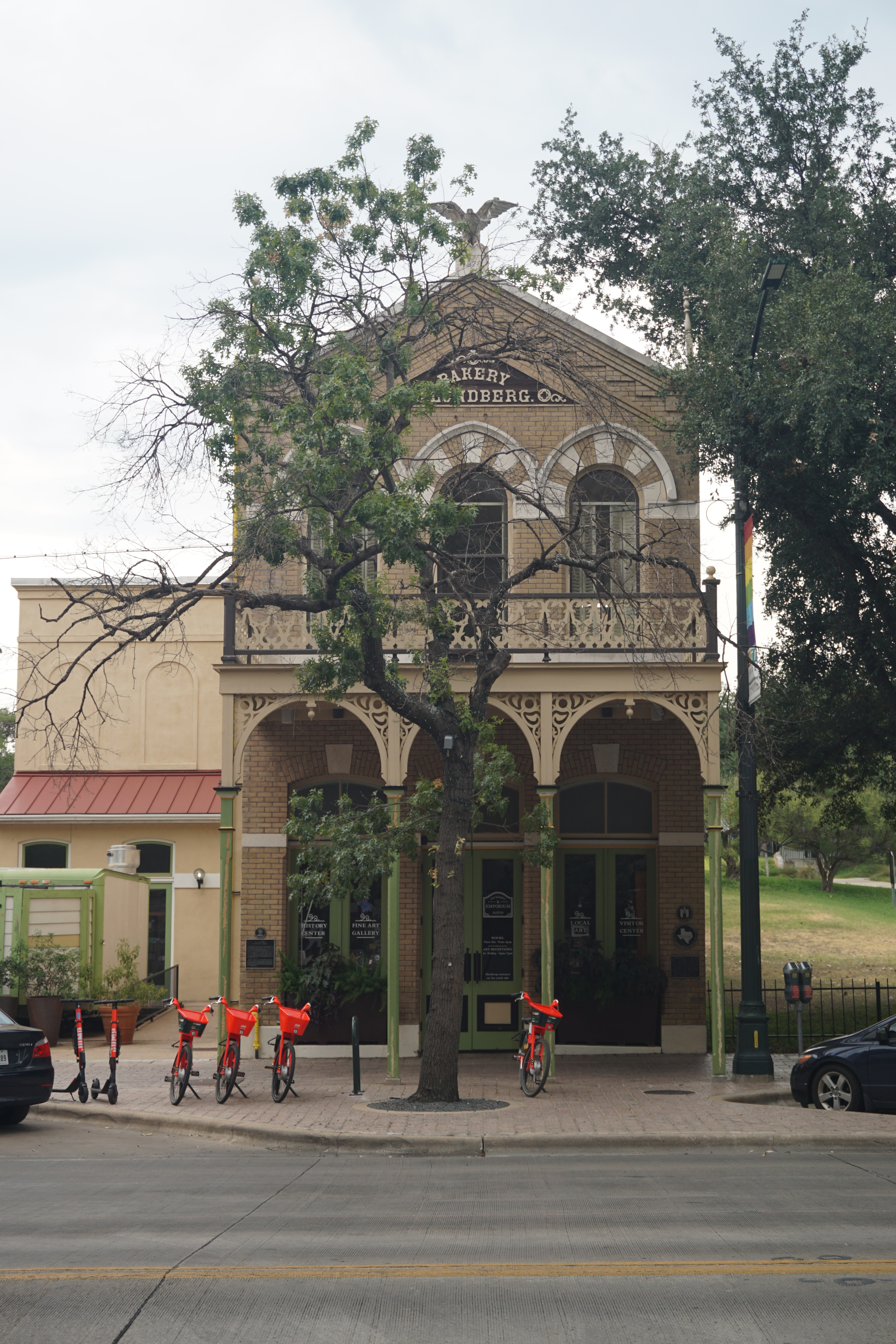
- The Old Bakery and Emporium

- Location within Texas Location within the United States
- Location: 1006 Congress Avenue, Austin, Texas, U.S.
- Coordinates: 30°16′19.92″N 97°44′29.4″W
- Area: 0.1 acres (0.040 ha)
- Built: 1876
- Architect: John Didelot
- Architectural style: Early Commercial
- Website: www.austintexas.gov/obemporium
- NRHP reference No.: 69000214
- RTHL No.: 14949
- TSAL No.: 621

Significant dates
- Added to NRHP: December 17, 1969
- Designated RTHL: 1966
- Designated TSAL: 5/28/1981

The Lundberg Bakery (now known as the Old Bakery and Emporium) is a historic building in downtown Austin, Texas, United States. It is located at 1006 Congress Avenue, half a block south of the Texas State Capitol grounds. It was added to the National Register of Historic Places on December 17, 1969.

== History ==
The building is constructed of limestone with a brick facade, and features a large cast-iron eagle at the peak of the gabled roof overlooking Congress Avenue. The building was completed for use as a bakery in 1876. The building served as a bakery until the death of its Swedish born owner, Charles Lundberg (1835-1895), who had settled into Austin during 1872. At the time the bakery first began operations, bread was not sold wrapped or packaged. People would wait in line with cloth lined baskets to place the bread in after buying it. Short story writer William Sydney Porter frequented the bakery as he passed it to and from work while employed at the General Land Office Building.

The building was used as a bakery until 1936, and after that for a variety of purposes. The building changed hands frequently until being bought and refurbished by the Austin Heritage Society in 1962. It was threatened with demolition in 1970, when a new building was planned for the Texas Department of Transportation, but saved when excavations next door uncovered the foundations of the previous state capitol building (a temporary structure built in 1882). Following this discovery, the foundations were converted to a historical plaza, and the bakery was saved. The Old Bakery was sold to the State of Texas which deeded the building and property to the City of Austin in 1980.

The Old Bakery and Emporium now houses the Lundberg-Maerki Historical Collection. The art gallery located on the third floor features a rotating schedule of exhibitions including artworks of local artists. The Old Bakery and Emporium operates as a consignment store spotlighting handcrafted gifts and fine art by local artisans with a visitor information center for tourist looking for fun attractions around Austin.

== Gallery ==
East elevation

East elevation detail
