= Sorcerers Safari Magic Camp =

Youth organization based in Canada

Sorcerer's Safari Magic Camp
- Formation: 1996
- Purpose: Teaching children the art of magic
- Headquarters: Toronto, Ontario
- Region served: World-wide
- Founder: Mike Segal
- Staff: Voluntary
- Website: www.Sorcerers-Safari.ca

Sorcerers Safari Magic Camp is a performance arts camp dedicated to teaching the art of magic to young people.

== History ==
Sorcerer's Safari is the creation of Torontonian Mike Segal, who has worked as a magician since high school.

In 1996, the program started with only a small number of day campers only. In 1997, ten magic enthusiasts joined Segal and his wife and staff at Camp Tamarack.

The camp's student body includes youths from Japan, South Africa, Belgium, France and England to be taught by professional magicians.

The camp became part of the Ontario Camping Association (OCA) in 2004.

== Classes ==
Performance related activities found at magic camp include, card magic class, coin magic class, balloon twisting, linking rings, and juggling. Other activities include the Stage workshops.

There are also classes in marketing, restaurant magic and stage performance.

== Staff/guests ==
Each year notable magicians and performers come to visit and teach at Sorcerers Safari Magic Camp. Some of these people include Lee Asher, Aaron Fisher, Soma, Eric Jones, Eric Buss, Nathan Kranzo, Oscar Munoz, Wayne Houchin, Dan & Dave Buck, Steve Valentine, Justin Flom, Suzanne, Daniel Garcia, Asi Wind, Michael Ammar, Shawn Farquhar and Greg Frewin.
