= Pecan Street Festival =

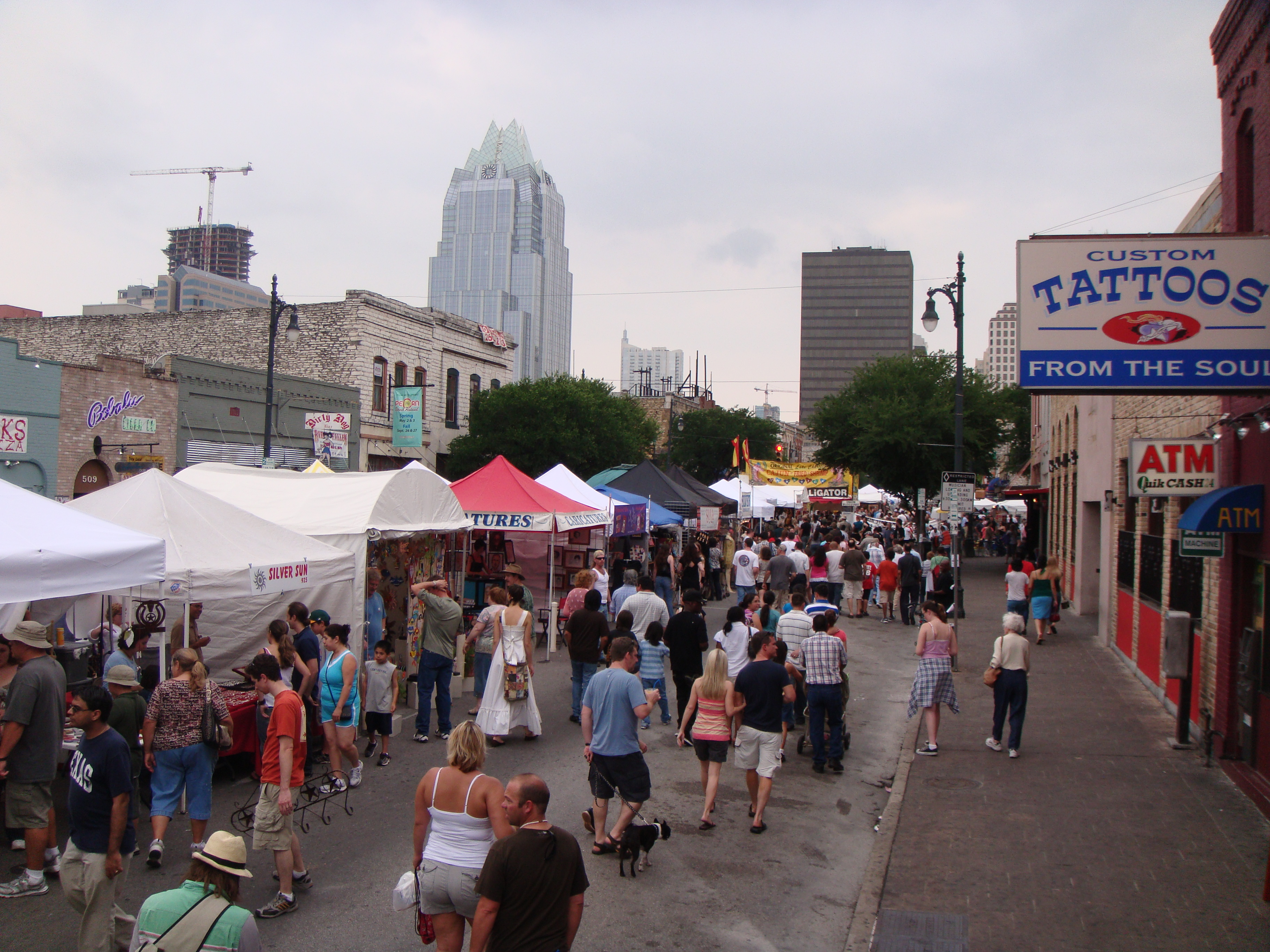
- Genre: Arts festival, Street fair
- Frequency: Annually
- Locations: Hill Country Galleria, Bee Cave, Texas
- Years active: 1978 - present
- Website: pecanstreetfestival.org

The Pecan Street Festival is the common name for the Old Pecan Street Spring and Fall Arts Festival, a free, bi-annual juried fine art and arts and crafts festival that is, as of May 2025, held at the Hill Country Galleria.

The festival was first held in Fall 1978. The festival includes juried original artists and artisans featuring painting, sculpture, wood, glass, jewelry, pottery, mosaics, candles, original clothing, etc.; five stages of live music, dance and performing arts; vendors; children's carnival, petting zoo, and art classes.

== History ==
This downtown Austin festival was originally dreamed up, produced, funded and had event insurance secured by entrepreneur Marcy Fletcher and artist Michael Wolverton. It was a juried show that required artists and craftsmen to have actually produced the work they sold. The management was later handed over to French Smith III, and was later taken over through legal action by the Old Pecan Street Association in 1997. Roadstar Productions, Smith's company, continued to produce it for eight more years. In the fall of 2006, the Old Pecan Street Association selected Special Events Management to run the festival.

In 2025 the Pecan Street Festival moved to the Hill Country Galleria in Bee Cave, Texas with the following justification given:

Due to the recent restructuring of Historic Sixth Street and public safety concerns, the May 2025 Pecan Fest will take place at Hill Country Galleria. Enjoy free parking and free admission, a clean and safe environment, and all the amenities of the Pecan Street Festival you know and love.

— Pecan Street Festival organizers, KTBC (TV)

== See also ==
- Sixth Street Historic District
