= Republic of Texas Biker Rally =

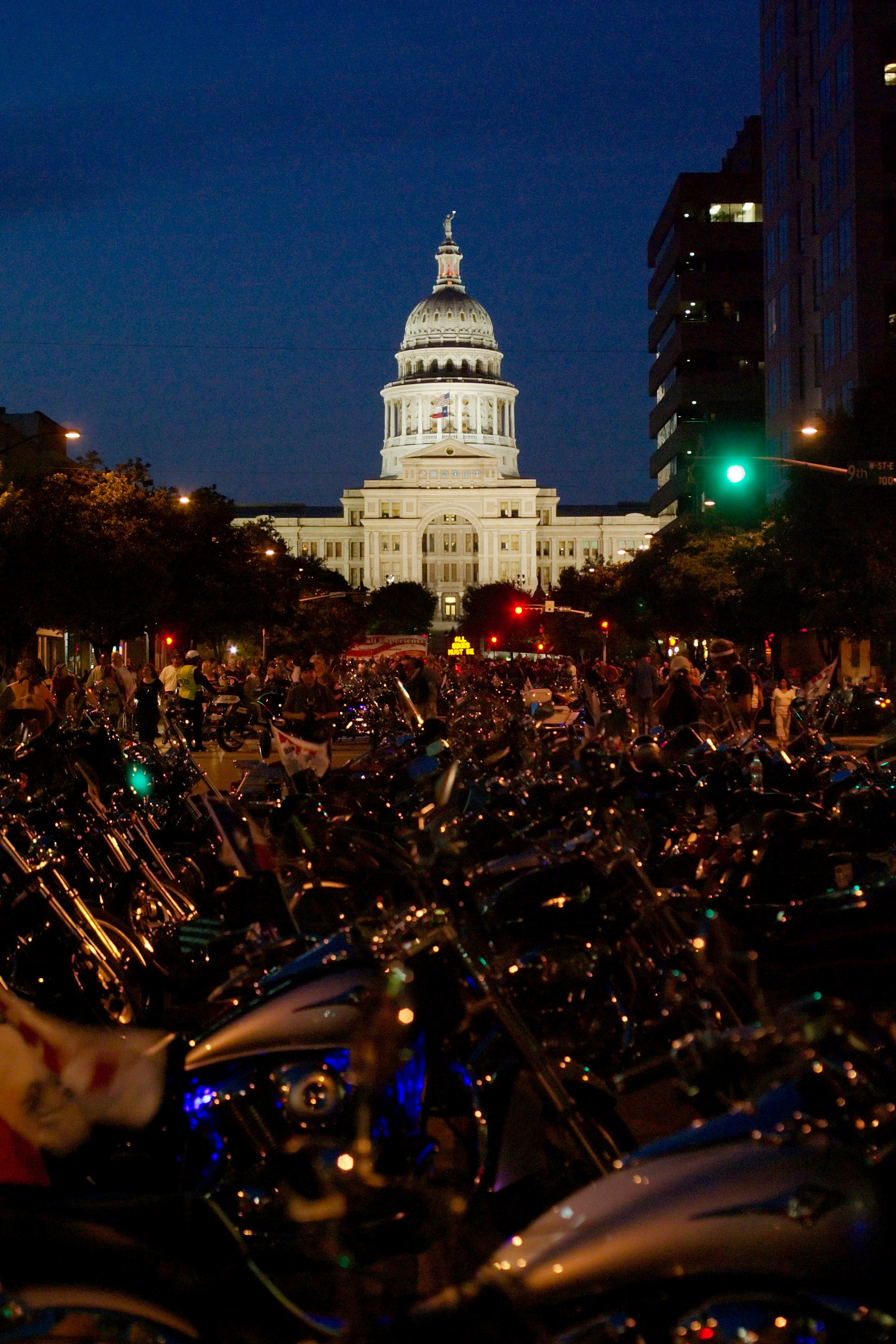
- Motorcycles parked under the Texas Capitol building in 2006
- Genre: Motorcycle rally
- Date: Near Memorial Day
- Frequency: Annual
- Location: Austin, Texas
- Inaugurated: 1995
- Attendance: 35,000 tickets 200,000 total
- Website: www.rotrally.com

The Republic of Texas Biker Rally (R. O. T Biker Rally) is a large motorcycle rally in Texas and the largest turnstile (ticketed admission) motorcycle rally in the United States. Similar events in Sturgis, South Dakota, and Daytona Beach, Florida, draw more attendees, but they are not ticketed events. A simple majority of attendees arrive on Harley-Davidson motorcycles, but the rally is open to everyone and all brands of bikes. Many attendees arrive in motor homes and stay on the premises.

The four-day event is held on the first, second, or third Thursday-through-Sunday after Memorial Day at the Travis County Exposition Center on the east edge of Austin. The City of Austin blocks off the downtown area for a massive biker street party on Congress Avenue on Friday night. The first R. O. T. Rally was held in 1995, continued to 2019 & will resume in 2021. It constitutes one of the largest annual tourist events in Central Texas, with an estimated economic impact of 30–35,000,000 dollars per year.

The event has drawn as many as 35,000 paying customers to the event grounds. City officials have estimated that the Friday night street party downtown draws as many as 200,000 spectators thus making it one of the largest motorcycle rallies of any kind in the country.

There was no rally in 2020 on grounds of COVID-19 pandemic.

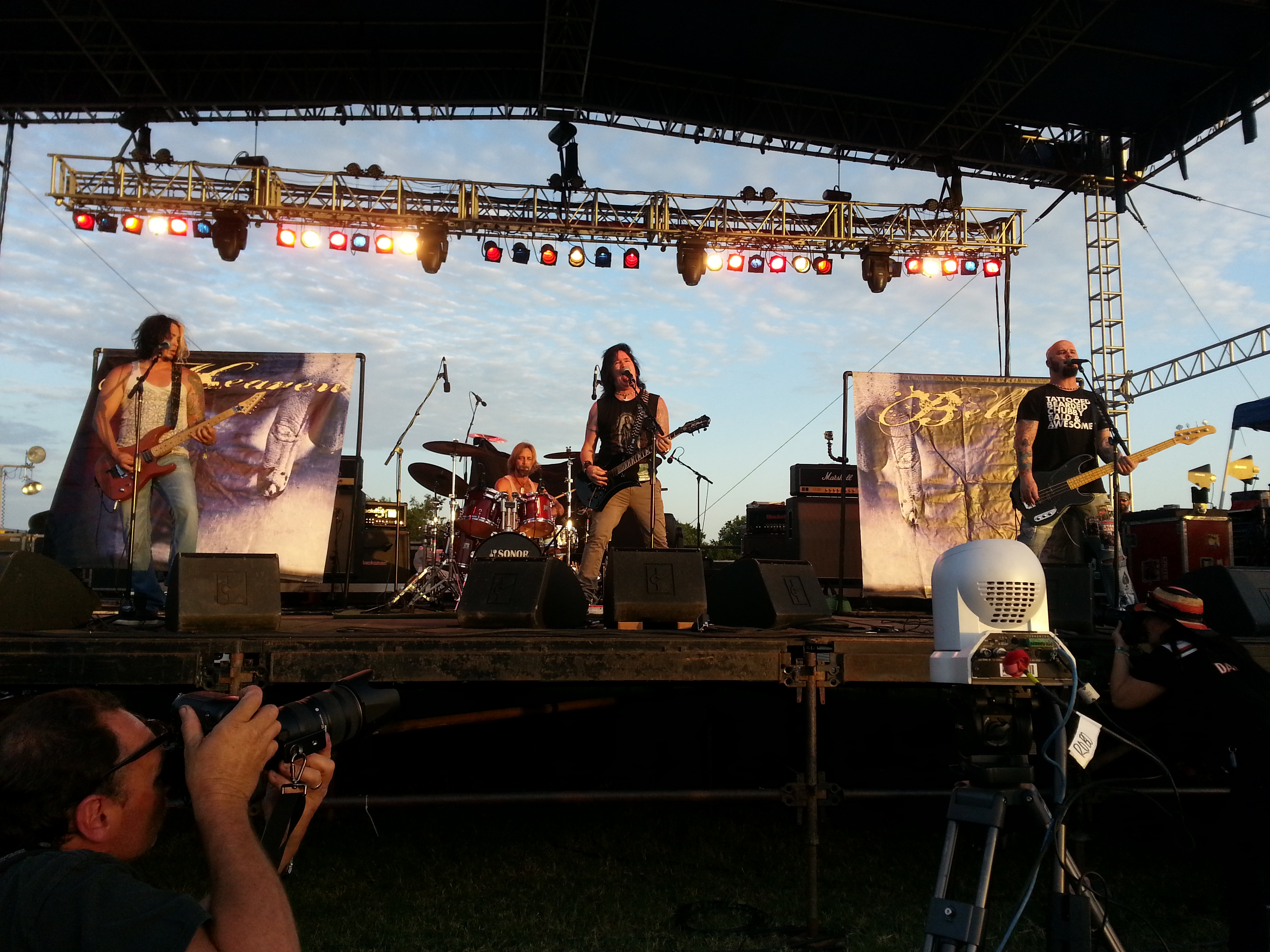
Heaven Below performing at the Republic of Texas Biker Rally

Musical entertainers who have appeared at the rally include: Willie Nelson, Waylon Jennings, Jerry Jeff Walker, Jerry Lee Lewis, Charlie Daniels, George Thoroughgood, Kid Rock, Hank Williams Jr, Brett Michaels, Ted Nugent, Joan Jett, Grand Funk Railroad, The Guess Who, Edgar Winter, Steppenwolf, the Georgia Satellites, Joe Ely, David Allan Coe, Ray Wylie Hubbard, Asleep At The Wheel, Mitch Ryder, and many more. Additional attractions typically include motorcycle stunt shows, celebrity bike builders, stage acts, and acres of motorcycle related vendors.
