= Sri Adwayananda Public School =

Location
- Kerala; India; 9.3290°N 76.6525°E

Sri Adwayananda Public School, administered by Alliance Educational Foundation, is a private, English-medium school in Malakkara, Kerala, India, that conducts classes from kindergarten to twelfth standard and also offers nursery.

== About the school ==
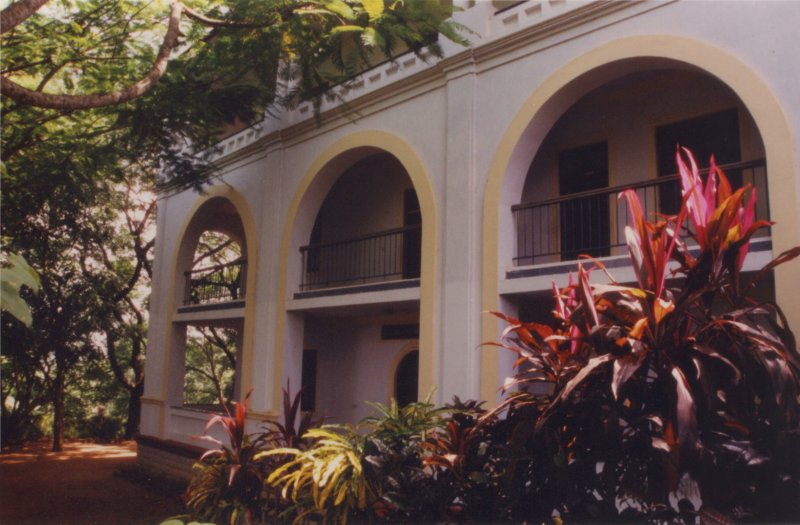
Sri Adwayananda Public School

A non-denominational school serving students from kindergarten through 12th grade operates two campuses in Malakkara village, near Chengannur, Kerala, India. Founded in 1987, the school accepts children from diverse socioeconomic and religious backgrounds. It is affiliated with both the Council for the Indian School Certificate Examinations and Cambridge (IGCSE/AS/A).

== Milestones ==
- Inauguration of School by Sri Adwayananda (Sri K. Padmanabha Menon) (1987)
- Described by Sir Bernard Ledwidge, Chairman of Britain Committee for UNICEF, as "the best school I have seen in all my career" (1991)
- Invited to present teaching approach to Mikhail Gorbachev's State of the World Forum (USA), 1997, 1999, 2000
- Received the KANFED 2000 Award for Best High School for Innovation
- First graduating class (2001)
- Rated by The Week magazine as “one of the top ten innovative schools in India” (2003)
- Rated one of the top three schools in South India by Vishukani magazine (published by Malayala Manorama) (2007)
- Celebration of the 25th anniversary of the School (2012)
- Annual International Colloquium on the Teacher-Student Relationship in Education series launched in August 2013
- Partnership with Decathlon India where senior students from the school have the opportunity to attend professional workshops and internships.
