= Fifth & West Residences =

Residential high-rise in Austin Texas

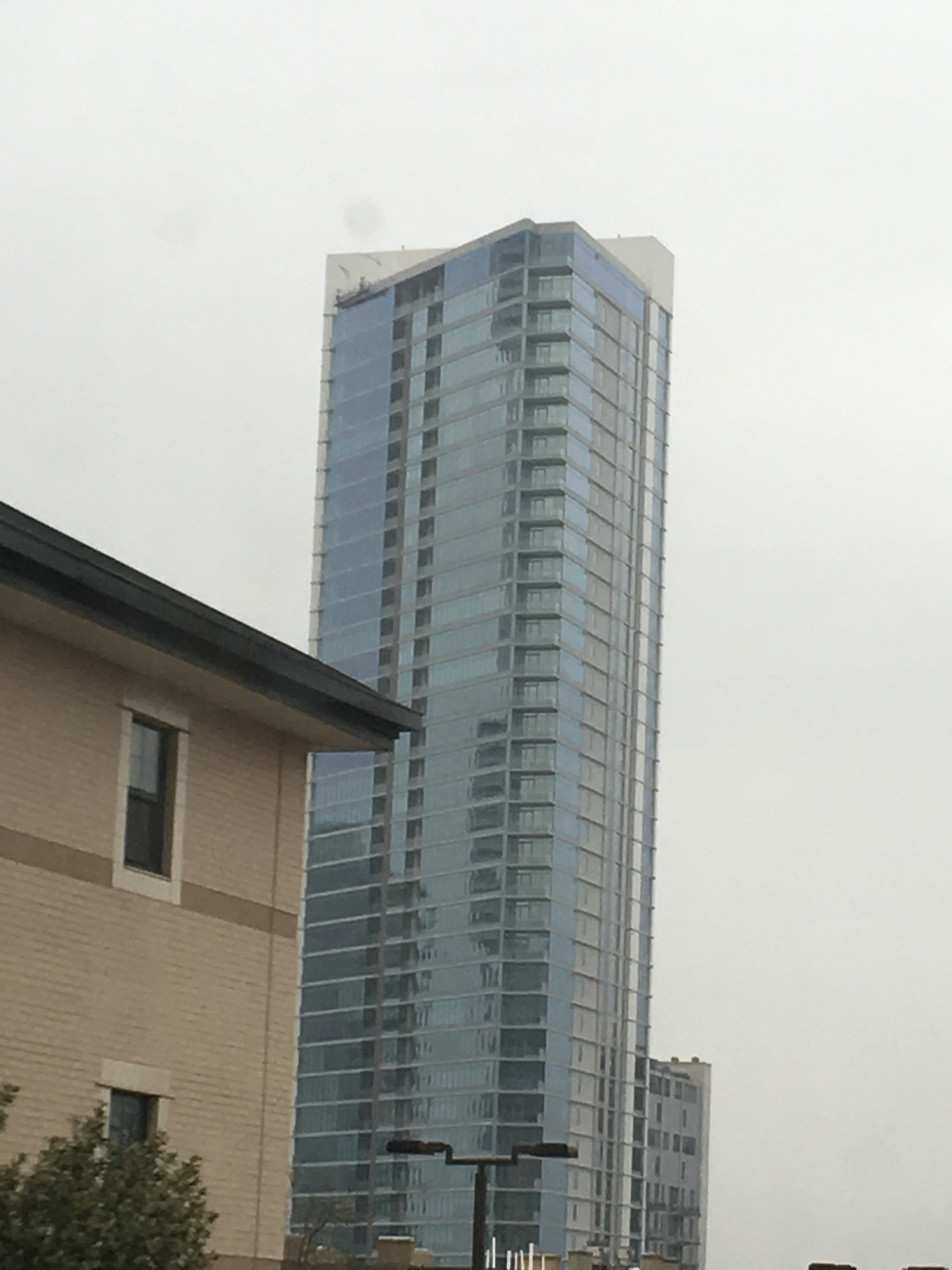
- Fifth & West from the Northeast

- Location within Texas
- Alternative names: Fifth & West

General information
- Status: Completed
- Type: Residential
- Classification: Seventh tallest building in Austin
- Location: 501 West Avenue, Austin, Texas, United States
- Coordinates: 30°16′10.33″N 97°45′2.22″W
- Groundbreaking: December 5th, 2014
- Completed: December 22nd, 2018

Height
- Height: 459 feet (140 m)

Technical details
- Floor count: 39

Design and construction
- Architecture firm: KTGY-GDA Architects
- Developer: Riverside Resources
- Structural engineer: Brockette/Davis/Drake, Inc.

Other information
- Number of units: 154

Website
- www.5thandwest.com

Fifth & West Residences is a 39-story residential skyscraper located at 501 West Ave. in Downtown Austin, Texas. Designed by KTGY's Dallas Studio (formerly known as GDA Architects, LLC ), the tower is the twelfth tallest in Austin at 459 feet (140 m). Fifth & West is the fourth tallest all-residential tower in Austin, behind The Independent, The Austonian and 360 Condominiums. The building is located along a Capitol View Corridor, creating a unique triangular tower atop a square podium base. The tower is located in the Shoal Creek floodplain.

== History ==
Fifth & West started construction with almost a year of foundation-related delays. The small quarter-block site caused issues removing material from the underground parking garage excavation, and weather delays such as the 2015 Memorial Day Floods added to the delays. In June 2016, a city pollution charge was filed after inspectors discovered runoff being funneled into nearby Shoal Creek. After the tower's foundation reached ground level in November 2016, construction resumed the planned speed and finished in just over two years.

== See also ==
- List of tallest buildings in Austin, Texas
- List of tallest buildings in Texas
