= List of tallest buildings in Austin =

Skyline of Austin
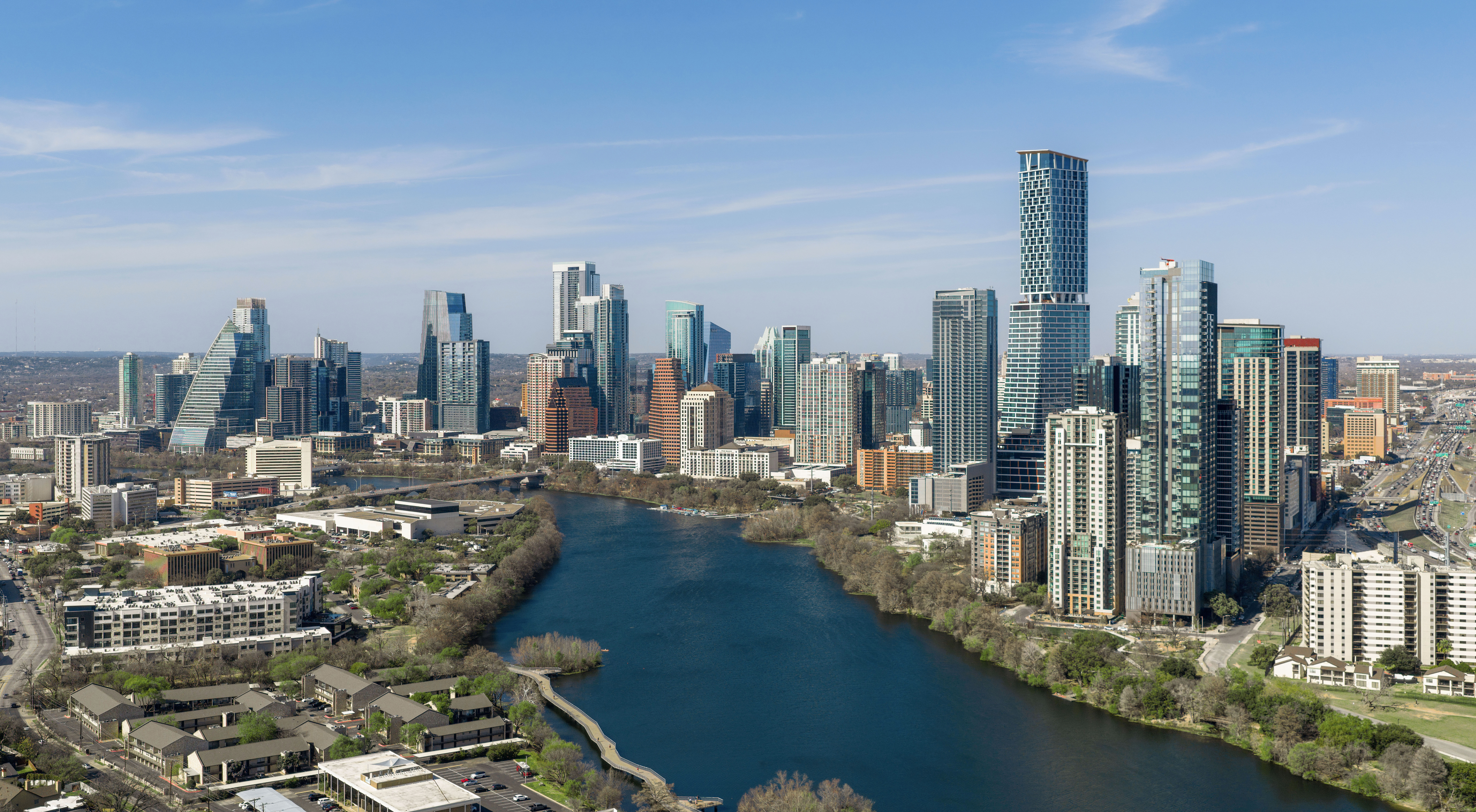
- Downtown Austin and the Colorado River in 2026
- Tallest building: Waterline (2026)
- Tallest building height: 1025 ft (312.4 m)
- First 150 m+ building: Frost Bank Tower (2004)

Number of tall buildings (2026)
- Taller than 100 m (328 ft): 53
- Taller than 150 m (492 ft): 19
- Taller than 200 m (656 ft): 6
- Taller than 300 m (984 ft): 1

Number of tall buildings — feet
- Taller than 300 ft (91.4 m): 66

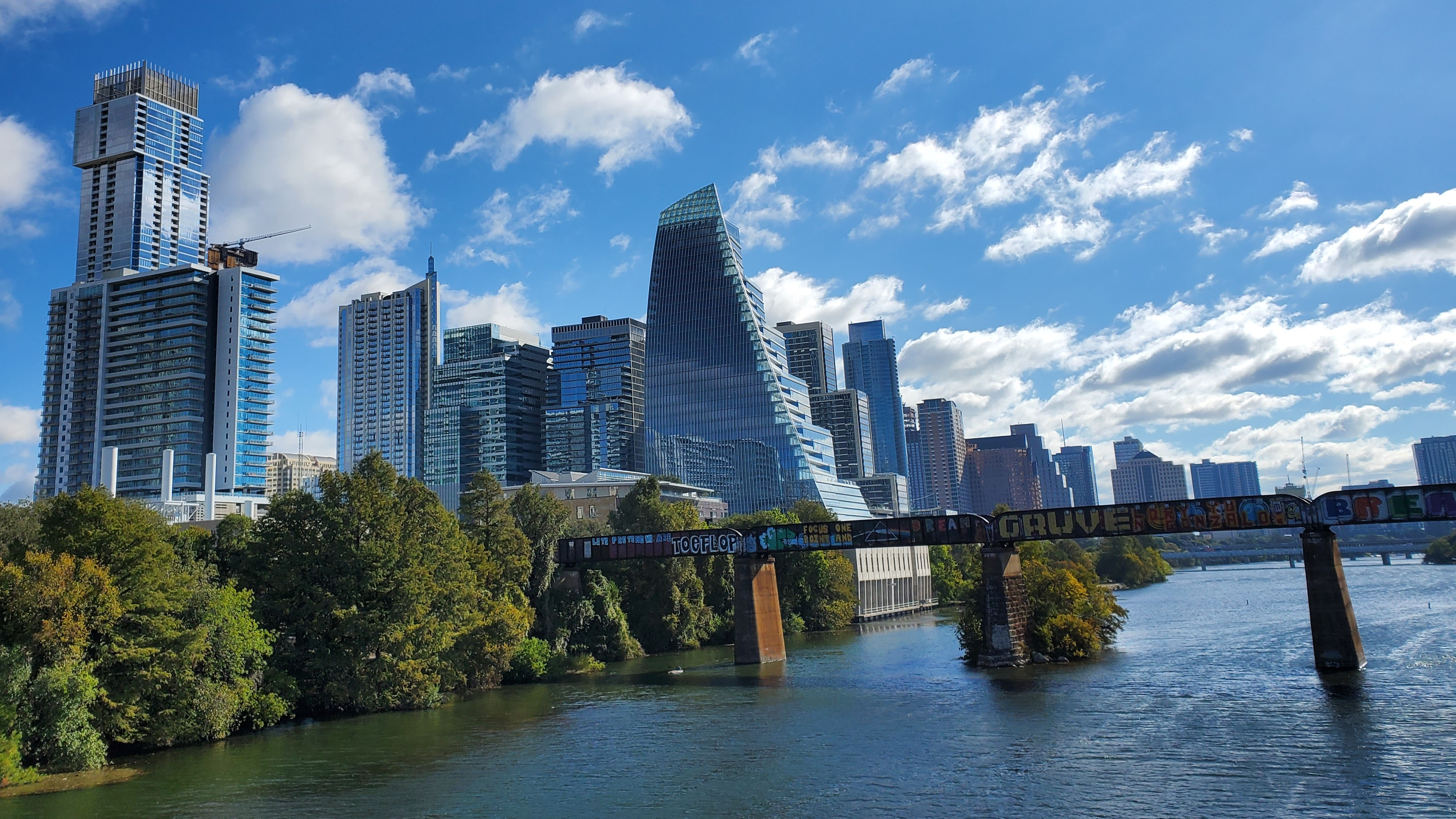
Austin from the Pfluger Pedestrian Bridge in 2022

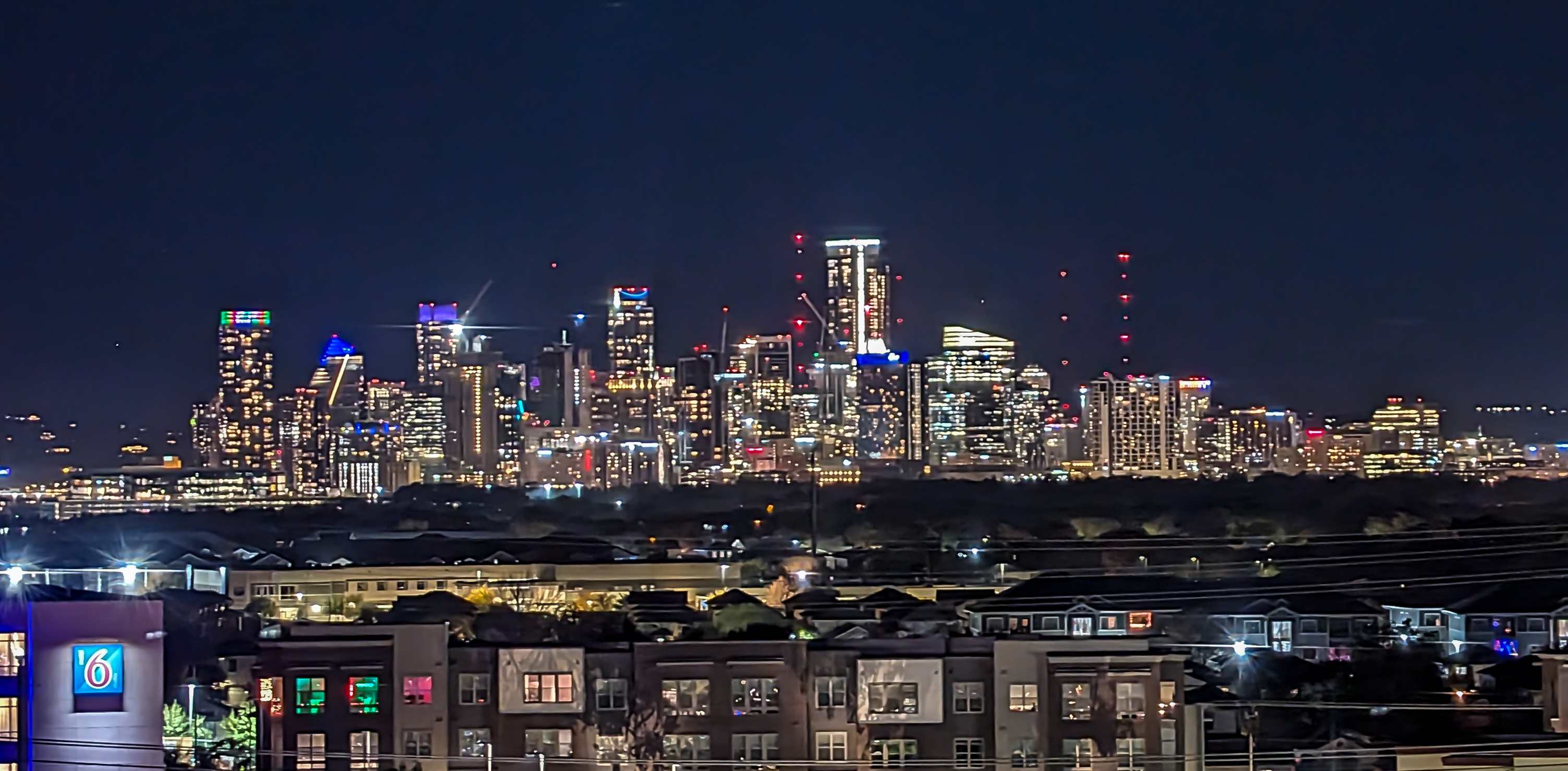
Austin at night in 2023

Austin is the capital of the U.S. state of Texas. Its metropolitan area is the fourth-largest in the state, with 2.5 million people. As of 2026, Austin is home to 66 completed buildings taller than 300 feet (91 m), 19 of which are at least 492 ft (150 m) in height. Austin's skyline is one of the largest in the Southern United States. It has the third most skyscrapers taller than 492 ft (150 m) in Texas, after Houston and Dallas. The tallest building in Austin is Waterline, a supertall skyscraper that was completed in 2026 at a height of 1,025 ft (312 m), making it the tallest building in Texas. Greater Austin is the smallest metropolitan area in North America with a supertall skyscraper.

With a height of 311 ft (95 m) the Texas State Capitol remained the tallest building in Austin long after its construction in 1888, with the city's central Congress Avenue otherwise lined with single-story buildings through the start of the 1900s. The eight-story Scarbrough Building and the nine-story Littlefield Building, built between 1910 and 1912, are considered to be Austin's first high-rises. The tallest building completed in the first half of the 20th century was the Main Building of the University of Texas at Austin, which holds offices as well as library space for the university. The downtown skyline remained predominantly low-rise until the 1960s, with the addition of the 28-story Westgate Tower in 1966 attracting controversy for its proximity to the capitol. The capitol's height was finally surpassed by the Procore Tower and the Bank of America Center in the 1970s. One American Center, completed in 1984, remained the tallest building in the city for two decades.

Since the 2000s, Austin has been undergoing an unprecedented skyscraper boom, concurrent with rapid population growth in the city and its metropolitan area. The Frost Bank Tower was the first building in Austin to exceed a height of 500 ft (152 m) it was completed in 2004. The boom was momentarily halted in the early 2010s due to the Great Recession, and accelerated in the mid-2010s; around two-thirds of high-rises taller than 300 ft (91 m) in Austin were built after 2014. The majority of new skyscrapers are residential, with the title of the city's tallest building changing hands four more times among residential towers between 2008 and 2023. The city's tech boom has also resulted in more office towers, such as Indeed Tower and the sail-shaped Block 185, which is intended to be fully leased by Google.

Most of Austin's tallest buildings are located in Downtown Austin, sitting directly north of the Colorado River. The Texas State Capitol separates the central skyline from residential towers in the West Campus neighborhood, many of which are inhabited by students attending the nearby University of Texas at Austin. Tall buildings are relatively absent on the southern side of the Colorado River, although a number of them are planned in the South Central Waterfront area. There are also a small number of high-rises in The Domain, a commercial and residential center located in the city's north that is referred to as Austin's "second downtown" In the 2020s, the boom saw the skyline extend eastwards towards Rainey Street Historic District, transforming the character of the neighborhood. Construction on Waterline began there in 2023 and was wrapped up in 2026.

== History ==
Number of buildings by height in Austin by the end of each year, including the Texas State Capitol. Click on the legend to toggle a specific height on or off. View chart definition.

Bearing a height of 311 ft (95 m), The Texas State Capitol remained the tallest structure in Austin long after its construction in the 1880s, with the city's central Congress Avenue otherwise lined with single-story buildings through the start of the 1900s. The eight-story Scarbrough Building and the nine-story Littlefield Building, built between 1910 and 1912, were Austin's first high-rise buildings; the Littlefield Building was the tallest commercial building in the U.S. west of New Orleans and east of San Francisco upon its completion. In 1928, the Austin City Council briefly considered setting a 100 ft (30 m) height limit for future construction in the city but backed away from the proposal.

After the mid-20th century, Downtown Austin began to transition from being predominantly composed of low-rise buildings to a skyline with high-rises. Beginning with the 26-story Westgate Tower, the addition of new skyscrapers to Downtown Austin between 1967 and 1980 led to an increasing realization that views of the state capitol from certain vantage points could become obscured. The capitol was also no longer the city's tallest building, surpassed in height by the Dobie Center and the Chase Bank Tower. (Note: The Dobie Center, completed in 1972, has a total height of 328 ft (100 m) and an architectural height of approximately 307 ft (94 m). The former value is taller than the 311 ft (95 m) height of the Texas State Capitol while the latter is shorter. The Chase Bank Tower, completed in 1974, has an architectural height of around 325 ft (99 m), making it unambiguously taller than the capitol building.) In response, the Texas State Legislature and the City of Austin created 35 Texas Capitol View Corridors that would preserve selected views of the capitol.

By the mid-1980s, Austin featured over a dozen skyscrapers, with at least 12 buildings built during the decade featuring at least 15 floors. Described by the Austin American-Statesman as "the first downtown high-rise wave", the uptick in skyscraper construction that began in the 1980s was mostly characterized by granite and limestone office buildings. More rapid construction of new high-rises in downtown Austin began by the 1990s and continued thereafter, contrasting a concurrent slowdown in the construction of new skyscrapers in Dallas and Houston.

Mark Lamster, an architecture critic for the Dallas Morning News, attributed the emergence of increasingly taller skyscrapers to the small size and high density of Austin, incentivizing vertical growth due to the resultingly high cost of land. The Statesman identified a second wave of new skyscrapers in Austin that began in the early 2000s, including construction of the Frost Bank Tower. By 2010, the construction of new residential buildings and office space for technology companies accounted for most of the city's new skyscrapers. By 2023, the combined height of Austin's high-rises overtook Dallas according to Texas Real Estate Source.

=== Historical skyline appearance ===
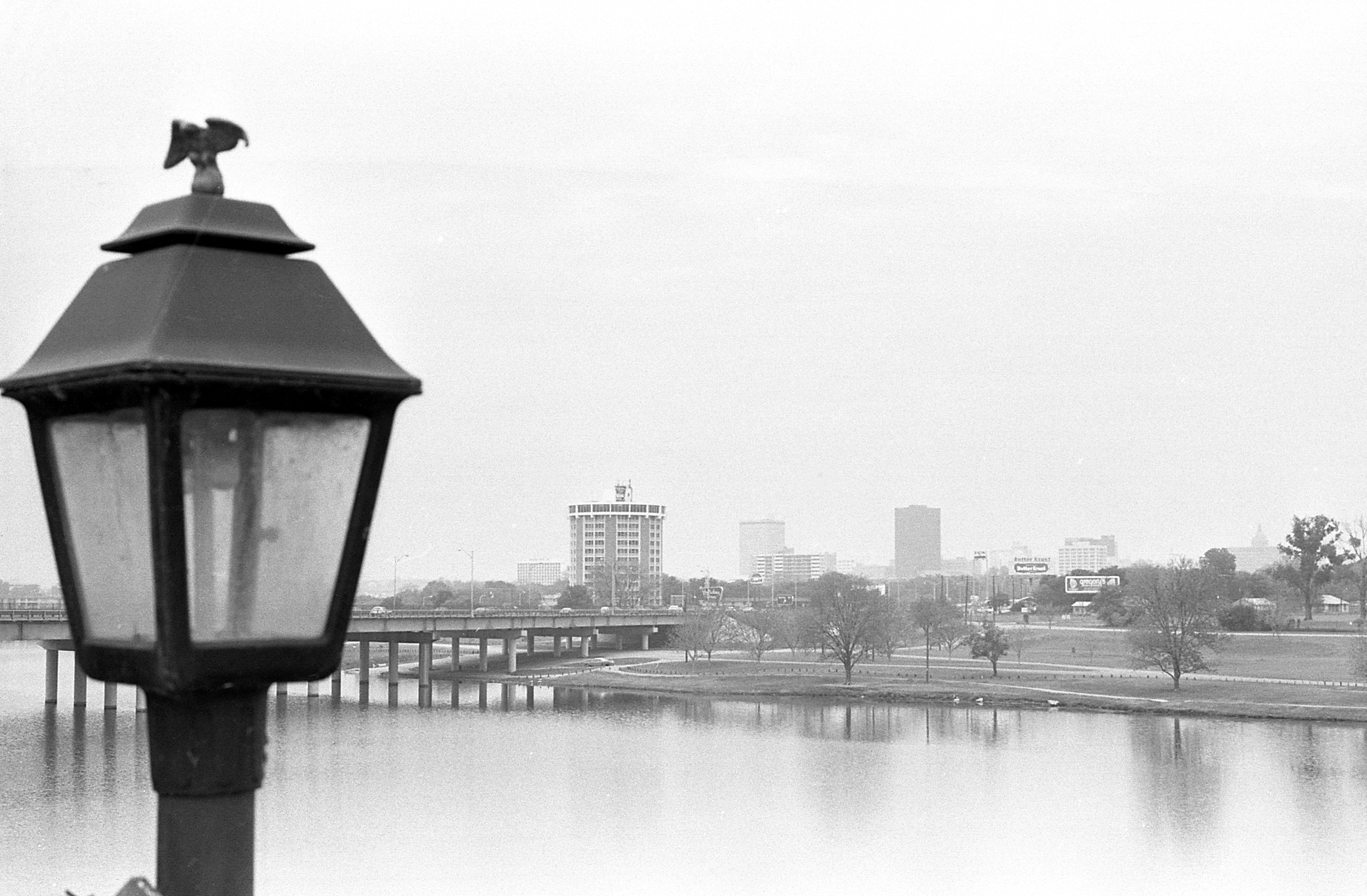
1976

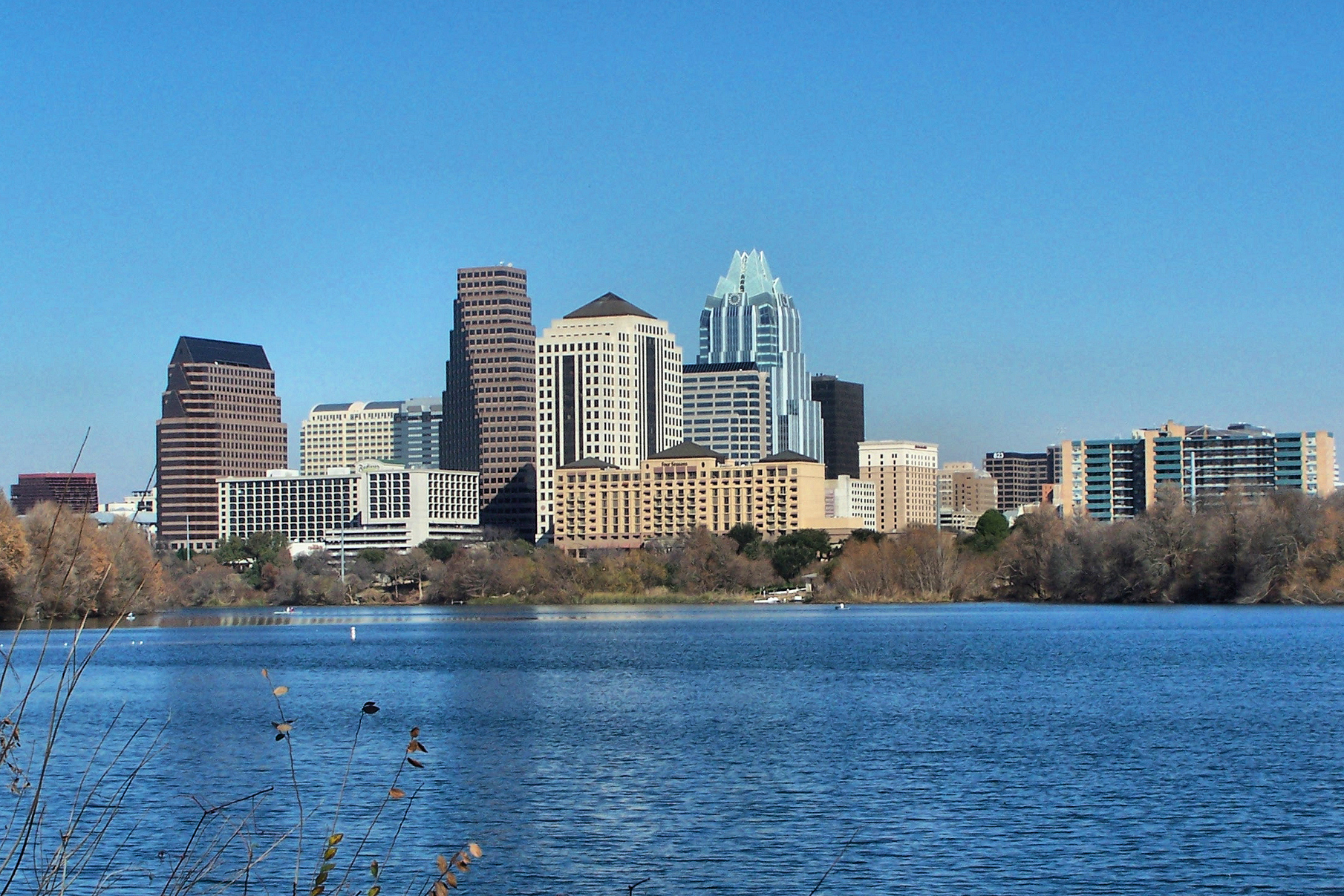
2006

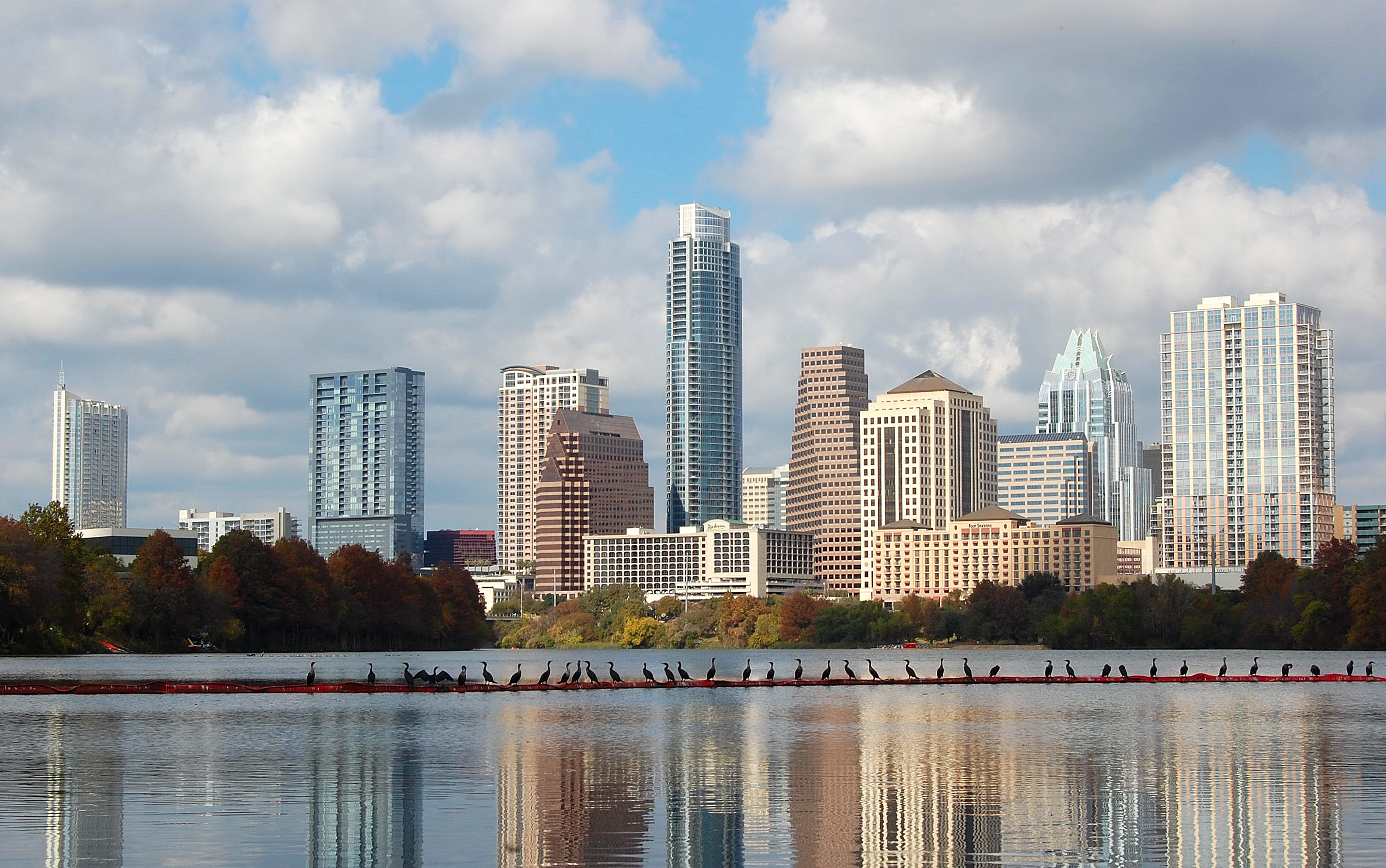
2012

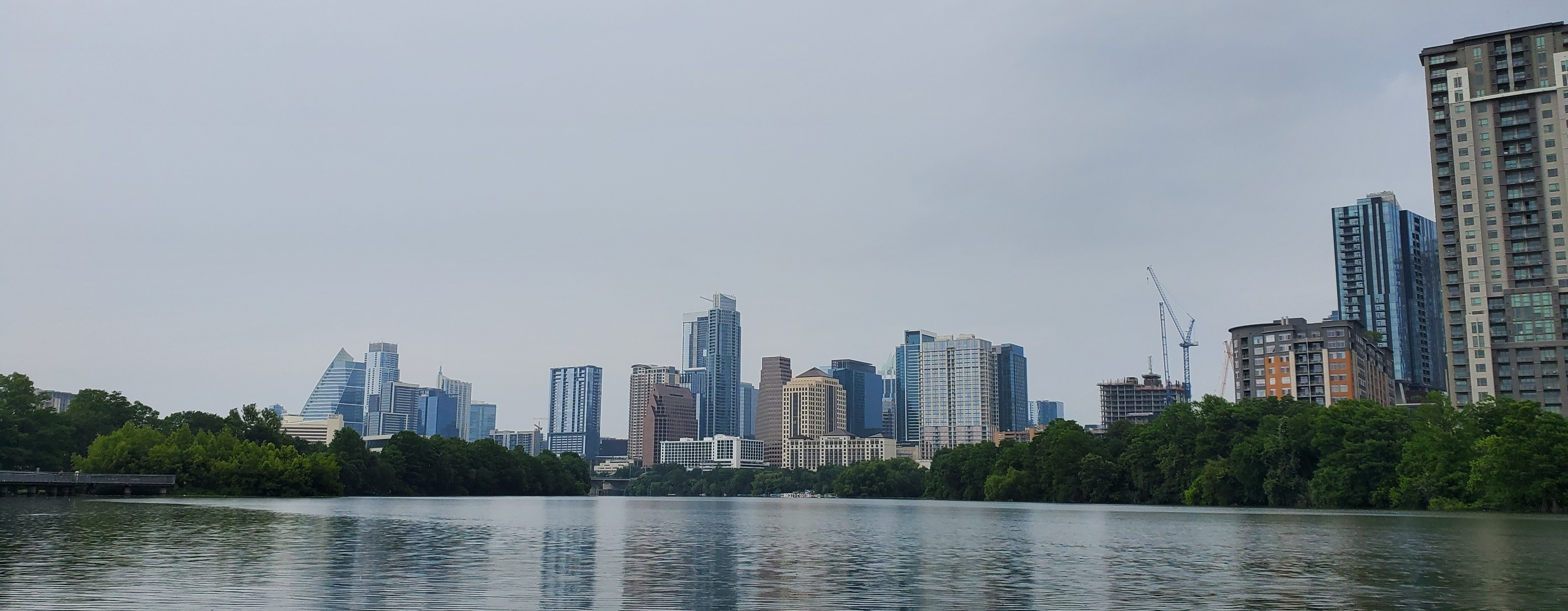
2023

== Cityscape ==
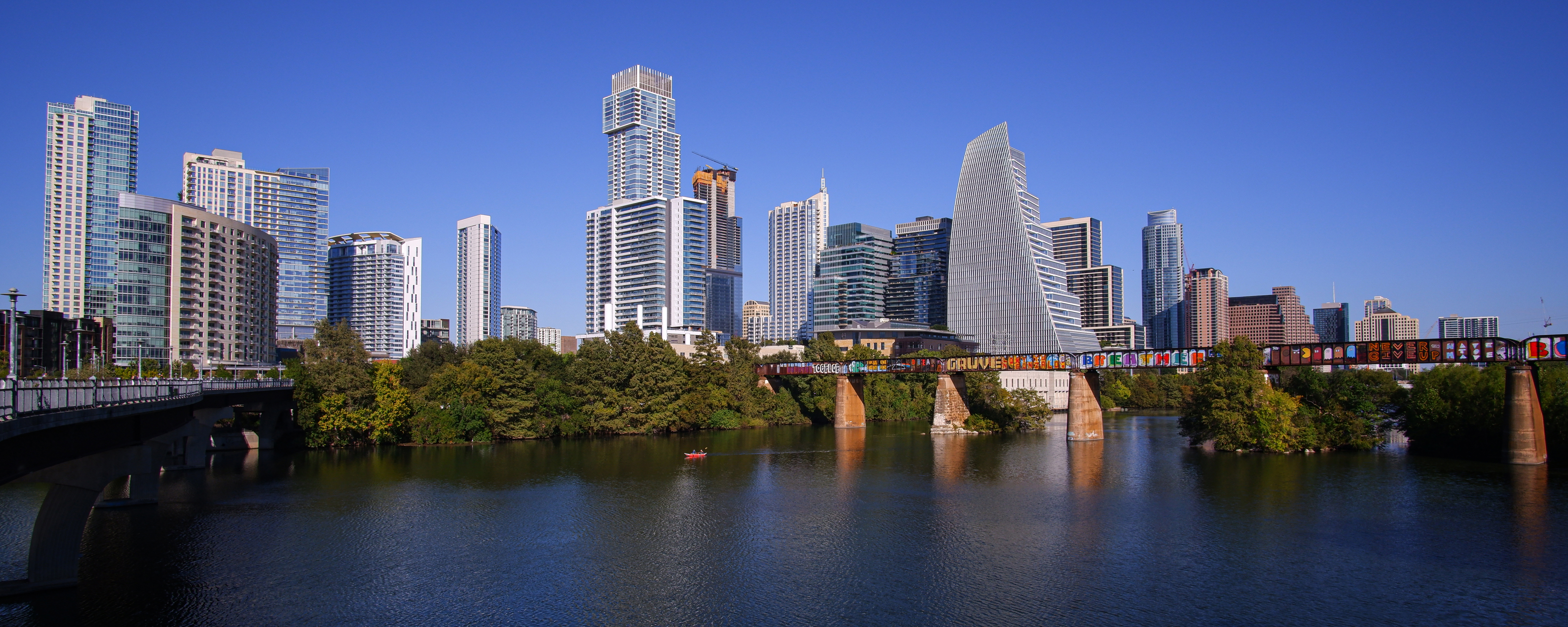
The Austin skyline viewed from across the Colorado River in October 2022 (Use cursor to identify buildings)

== Map of tallest buildings ==
Buildings taller than 300 feet (91 m) are concentrated in downtown Austin and the Rainey Street Historic District with one building The Domain II, located in North Austin.

Buildings taller than 300 feet (91 m) in Austin. Each marker is numbered by height and colored by the decade of the building's completion. An asterisk (*) next to the building's name indicates it is located outside the map.
- 1950s and before
- 1960s
- 1970s
- 1980s
- 1990s
- 2000s
- 2010s
- 2020s
1 Waterline
2 Sixth and Guadalupe
3 The Republic
4 The Independent
5 The Austonian
7 Modern Austin
8 415 Colorado Street
9 Fairmont Austin
10 360 Condominiums
11 Block 185
12 44 East Avenue
13 Paseo
14 The Travis
15 Indeed Tower
16 Hanover Republic Square
17 Frost Bank Tower
18 Hanover Brazos Street
19 700 River
20 W Austin Hotel & Residences
21 Fifth & West
22 Vesper
23 300 Colorado
24 Spring
25 Northshore
26 The Bowie
27 70 Rainey
28 Ashton
29 JW Marriott Convention Hotel
30 Four Seasons Residences Austin
31 One American Center
32 500 West 2nd Street
33 One Eleven Congress
34 Colorado Tower
35 Austin Proper
36 Third + Shoal
37 Austin Marriott Downtown
38 Austin Hilton Convention Center Hotel
39 The Waller
40 405 Colorado
41 Natiivo
42 5th & Brazos
43 The Quincy
44 Alexan Waterloo
45 Hyatt Centric
46 Seaholm Residences
47 Windsor on the Lake
48 Bank of America Center
49 The Linden
50 The Domain II*
51 Union on San Antonio
52 300 West 6th Street
53 Aloft Austin Downtown
54 Procore Tower
55 The Monarch
56 100 Congress Avenue
57 Yugo Austin Waterloo
58 Union on 24th Street
59 Villas on 24th
60 Texas State Capitol
61 San Jacinto Center
62 UT Austin Tower
63 Dobie Center
64 Icon
65 301 Congress Avenue
66 Hotel ZaZa & Apartments

== Tallest buildings ==
There are 66 skyscrapers in Austin that stand at least 300 feet (91 m) tall as of 2026, based on standard height measurement which includes spires and architectural details but does not include antenna masts.

Was the tallest building in Austin upon completion
*Topped out but not yet completed

Rank (Note: Buildings tied in height are sorted by year of completion, and then alphabetically.)	Name	Image	Location	Height ft (m) (Note: Unless otherwise noted, heights and floor counts are values assessed by the CTBUH.)	Floors	Year	Purpose	Notes
1	Waterline		30°15′42″N 97°44′21″W	1,025 (312.4)	74	2026	Mixed-use	Tallest building in Texas, surpassing the JPMorgan Chase Tower. Topped out in August 2025. Mixed-use office, residential, and hotel building.
2	Sixth and Guadalupe	Sixth & Guadalupe in 2023	30°16′11″N 97°44′48″W	875 (266.7)	66	2023	Mixed-use	Tallest building in Austin from 2023 to 2026. Alternatively known as 6th + Guadalupe, 6 X Guadalupe, and 600 Guadalupe.. Topped out in November 2022. Mixed-use residential and office building.
3	The Republic		30°16′01″N 97°44′52″W	710 (216)	46	2025	Office	Largest office building in Austin with over 800,000 square feet.
4	The Independent		30°16′04″N 97°45′04″W	694 (211.4)	58	2019	Residential	Commonly known as the Jenga Tower or Tetris Tower due to its design. Tallest building in Austin from 2019 to 2023, until surpassed by Sixth and Guadalupe.
5	The Austonian	The Austonian in April 2010	30°15′53″N 97°44′40″W	683 (208.2)	56	2010	Residential	Tallest building in Austin from 2010 to 2019, until surpassed by The Independent.
6	ATX Tower	ATX Tower	30°16′07″N 97°44′46″W	675 (205.7)	58	2025	Residential	
7	Modern Austin	–	30°15′38″N 97°44′19″W	655 (199.6) (Note: Height data from SkyscraperPage. CTBUH either lacks information on the building's height or does not list this building.)	55	2025	Residential	
8	415 Colorado Street	415 Colorado	30°16′02″N 97°44′39″W	634 (193.1)	50	2025	Residential	
9	Fairmont Austin	Fairmont Austin in August 2021	30°15′45″N 97°44′17″W	591 (180)	36	2018	Hotel	Largest hotel in Austin and second largest Fairmont Hotels and Resorts hotel globally upon completion, including 1,048 rooms An approximately 170 ft (52 m) tall spire rises from the rooftop
10	360 Condominiums	360 Condominiums in August 2009	30°16′02″N 97°44′59″W	581 (177.1)	45	2008	Residential	Tallest building in Austin from 2008–2010 until surpassed by The Austonian
11	Block 185	Block 18 Tower on Sept 15 2023	30°15′56″N 97°45′02″W	577 (175.9)	35	2022	Office	Largest and tallest office building in Austin from 2022-2025
12	44 East Avenue	44 East Avenue in November 2021	30°15′21″N 97°44′21″W	573 (174.7)	50	2023	Residential	Tallest building in the Rainey Street Historic District
13	Paseo	–	30°15′34″N 97°44′20″W	567 (172.8)	48	2025	Residential	Topped out in 2024.
14	The Travis	The Travis	30°15′37″N 97°44′25″W	562 (171.3)	50	2025	Residential	
15	Indeed Tower	Indeed Tower	30°16′08″N 97°44′39″W	542 (165.2)	36	2021	Office	Known as Block 71 during construction
16	Frost Bank Tower	Frost Bank Tower in February 2009	30°15′59″N 97°44′34″W	516 (157.2)	33	2004	Office	Tallest building in Austin from 2004–2008 until surpassed by 360 Condominiums First high-rise in the U.S. to begin construction after the September 11 attacks, with construction beginning on November 27, 2001.
17	Hanover Republic Square	Hanover Republic Square	30°16′04″N 97°44′46″W	516 (157.3)	44	2023	Residential	
18	Hanover Brazos Street		30°15′52″N 97°44′32″W	513 (156.4)	45	2023	Residential	
19	700 River		30°15′28″N 97°44′19″W	497 (151.4)	42	2024	Residential	
20	W Austin Hotel & Residences	W Austin Hotel & Residences in June 2010	30°15′57″N 97°44′49″W	477 (145.3)	36	2010	Mixed-use	Mixed-use residential and hotel building. Part of the Block 21 city block
21	Fifth & West	Fifth & West in August 2019	30°16′10″N 97°45′02″W	459 (139.9)	39	2019	Residential	
22	Vesper	Vesper	30°15′35″N 97°44′15″W	455 (138.7)	41	2024	Residential	
23	300 Colorado	300 Colorado in December 2021	30°15′58″N 97°44′44″W	446 (135.8)	34	2021	Office	
24	Spring	Spring in September 2009	30°16′08″N 97°45′15″W	434 (132.3)	43	2009	Residential	
25	Northshore	Northshore in March 2016	30°15′55″N 97°44′58″W	424 (129.3)	38	2016	Residential	Tallest apartment building in Austin
26	The Bowie	The Bowie in July 2015	30°16′09″N 97°45′19″W	423 (128.9)	37	2015	Residential	
27	70 Rainey	70 Rainey	30°15′31″N 97°44′21″W	419 (127.7)	33	2019	Residential	Formerly the tallest building in the Rainey Street Historic District
28	Ashton	Ashton in September 2009	30°15′52″N 97°44′43″W	412 (125.5)	36	2009	Residential	Formerly known as Altavida
29	JW Marriott Convention Hotel	JW Marriott Convention Hotel in July 2015	30°15′53″N 97°44′35″W	408 (124.4)	34	2015	Hotel	Second largest JW Marriott hotel globally and formerly largest hotel in Austin upon completion, with 1,012 guest rooms
30	Four Seasons Residences Austin	Four Seasons Residences Austin in April 2010	30°15′44″N 97°44′30″W	401 (122.3)	32	2010	Residential	Part of the San Jacinto Center
31	One American Center	One American Center in November 2007	30°16′08″N 97°44′36″W	401 (122.2)	32	1984	Office	Tallest building in Austin from 1984–2004 until surpassed by Frost Bank Tower. Also known as 600 Congress.
32	500 West 2nd Street	500 West 2nd Street in October 2019	30°15′58″N 97°44′57″W	400 (121.9)	28	2017	Office	
33	One Eleven Congress	One Congress Plaza in November 2008	30°15′49″N 97°44′37″W	398 (121.3)	30	1987	Office	Formerly known as One Congress Plaza
34	Colorado Tower	Colorado Tower in July 2015	30°15′57″N 97°44′41″W	397 (121)	29	2015	Office	
35	Austin Proper	Austin Proper in October 2019	30°15′59″N 97°45′00″W	397 (121)	32	2019	Mixed-use	Mixed-use residential and hotel building.
36	Third + Shoal	Third + Shoal in November 2019	30°16′00″N 97°45′00″W	387 (118)	28	2018	Office	
37	Austin Marriott Downtown	Austin Marriott Downtown in March 2020	30°15′46″N 97°44′29″W	386 (117.7)	31	2020	Hotel	
38	Austin Hilton Convention Center Hotel	Austin Hilton Convention Center Hotel in October 2007	30°15′55″N 97°44′17″W	377 (114.9)	31	2004	Mixed-use	Mixed-use residential and hotel building
39	The Waller	–	30°16′16″N 97°44′04″W	371 (113)	32	2024	Mixed-use	Mixed-use residential and hotel building
40	405 Colorado	405 Colorado	30°16′00″N 97°44′40″W	366 (111.6)	25	2022	Office	
41	Natiivo	Natiivo	30°15′23″N 97°44′20″W	358 (109.1)	33	2022	Residential	
42	5th & Brazos	The Thompson	30°16′01″N 97°44′28″W	357 (108.8)	31	2021	Mixed-use	Also known as The Thompson, or Sienna at the Thompson. Mixed-use residential and hotel building
43	The Quincy	The Quincy	30°15′39″N 97°44′20″W	354 (108)	30	2021	Mixed-use	Mixed-use residential and office building.
44	Alexan Waterloo	Alexan Waterloo in May 2020	30°16′16″N 97°44′02″W	350 (106.7)	29	2022	Residential	
45	Hyatt Centric	Hyatt Centric	30°16′11″N 97°44′30″W	345 (105.2)	31	2022	Hotel	
46	Seaholm Residences	Seaholm Residences in September 2016	30°16′02″N 97°45′08″W	341 (103.9)	30	2016	Residential	
47	Windsor on the Lake	Windsor on the Lake at December 2008	30°15′21″N 97°44′22″W	339 (103.3)	31	2008	Residential	Formerly known as The Legacy on the Lake
48	Bank of America Center	Bank of America Center in April 2008	30°16′04″N 97°44′33″W	336 (102.4)	25	1975	Office	Tallest building in Austin from 1975–1984 until surpassed by One American Center. Originally known as the Austin National Bank Tower and formerly known as NationsBank Tower and Interfirst Bank Tower.
49	The Linden	The Linden	30°16′46″N 97°44′32″W	333 (101.5)	28	2023	Residential	
50	The Domain II	Domain Tower II	30°23′41″N 97°43′19″W	332 (101.2)	24	2023	Office	Tallest building in Austin outside of downtown
51	Union on San Antonio		30°17′00″N 97°44′34″W	332 (101.2)	29	2024	Residential	
52	300 West 6th Street	300 West 6th Street in April 2010	30°16′09″N 97°44′44″W	328 (100)	23	2002	Office	
53	Aloft Austin Downtown and Element Austin Downtown	Aloft Austin Downtown and Element Austin Downtown in October 2019	30°16′08″N 97°44′32″W	328 (100)	31	2017	Hotel	Combination of two hotel brands managed by White Lodging
54	Procore Tower	Chase Bank Tower in November 2007	30°16′06″N 97°44′42″W	325 (99.1)	22	1974	Office	Tallest building in Austin from 1974–1975 until surpassed by Bank of America Center. Constructed as American Bank Plaza and formerly known as American Bank Building, MBank Tower, Bank One Tower, and Chase Bank Tower. A renovation completed in 1994 introduced 40 ft (12 m) tall roof addition and replaced the formerly gold-tinted glass façade with pewter-colored glass.
55	The Monarch	The Monarch in July 2010	30°16′09″N 97°45′08″W	323 (98.5)	29	2008	Residential	
56	100 Congress Avenue	100 Congress in November 2007	30°15′51″N 97°44′42″W	320 (97.5)	22	1987	Office	
57	Yugo Austin Waterloo	Yugo Austin Waterloo	30°17′18″N 97°44′39″W	320 (97.5)	30	2022	Residential	Tallest building in West Campus
58	Union on 24th Street	–	30°17′15″N 97°44′43″W	320 (97.5)	29	2024	Residential	
59	Villas on 24th	–	30°17′16″N 97°44′40″W	312 (95)	31	2025	Residential	
60	Texas State Capitol	The Texas State Capitol in August 2019	30°16′29″N 97°44′25″W	311 (94.8)	4	1888	Government	6th-tallest state capitol in the United States and largest by gross area. Tallest building in Austin from 1888–1974 until surpassed by the Chase Bank Tower.
61	San Jacinto Center	San Jacinto Center in April 2010	30°15′45″N 97°44′34″W	310 (94.5)	21	1987	Office	Initial plans to build two identical buildings were scrapped due to a recession in the early 1990s
62	UT Austin Tower	The UT Austin Tower in November 2007	30°17′10″N 97°44′22″W	307 (93.6)	29	1937	Mixed-use	Mixed-use office and library building.
63	Dobie Center	Dobie Center in August 2019	30°17′00″N 97°44′29″W	307 (93.6)	29	1971	Residential	
64	Icon	–	30°17′07″N 97°44′36″W	307 (93.6)	30	2025	Residential	
65	301 Congress Avenue	301 Congress in February 2009	30°15′55″N 97°44′35″W	306 (93.3)	22	1986	Office	
66	Hotel ZaZa & Apartments	Hotel ZaZa & Apartments in January 2020	30°16′02″N 97°44′47″W	305 (93)	24	2019	Mixed-use	Mixed-use residential and hotel building.

== Tallest under construction ==
There are two buildings under construction in Austin that are expected to be at least 300 ft (91 m) tall, as of 2026.

Name	Height ft (m)	Floors	Year	Purpose	Notes
Embassy Suites by Hilton/Tempo by Hilton	371 (113)	30	2029	Hotel	
Mulva Hall	306 (93)	17	2028	Mixed-use	

== Timeline of tallest buildings ==
Nine buildings have held the title of tallest building in Austin.

Name	Image	Street address	Years as tallest	Height ft (m)	Floors	Reference
Texas State Capitol	Texas State Capitol	1100 Congress Avenue	1888–1974	311 (95)	4	
Chase Bank Tower	Chase Bank Tower	210 West 6th Street	1974–1975	325 (99)	22	
Bank of America Center	Bank of America Center	515 Congress Avenue	1975–1984	336 (102)	25	
600 Congress	One American Center	116 West 6th Street	1984–2004	401 (122)	32	
Frost Bank Tower	Frost Bank Tower	120 East 4th Street	2004–2008	516 (157)	33	
360 Condominiums	360 Condominiums	360 Nueces Street	2008–2010	581 (177)	45	
The Austonian	The Austonian	201 Colorado Street	2010–2019	683 (208)	56	
The Independent		301 West Avenue	2019–2023	694 (212)	58	
Sixth & Guadalupe	Sixth & Guadalupe in 2023	400 West 6th Street	2023–2026	875 (267)	66	
Waterline		98 Red River Street	2026—present	1,025 (312.4)	74	

== See also ==
- List of tallest buildings in Texas
- List of tallest buildings in the United States
- List of tallest structures in the United States
- List of tallest buildings in Dallas
- List of tallest buildings in El Paso
- List of tallest buildings in Fort Worth
- List of tallest buildings in Houston
- List of tallest buildings in San Antonio
- List of tallest buildings in Corpus Christi
