= Bank of America Center (Austin, Texas) =

Skyscraper in Austin, Texas, U.S.

Coordinates: 30°16′3″N 97°44′33″W

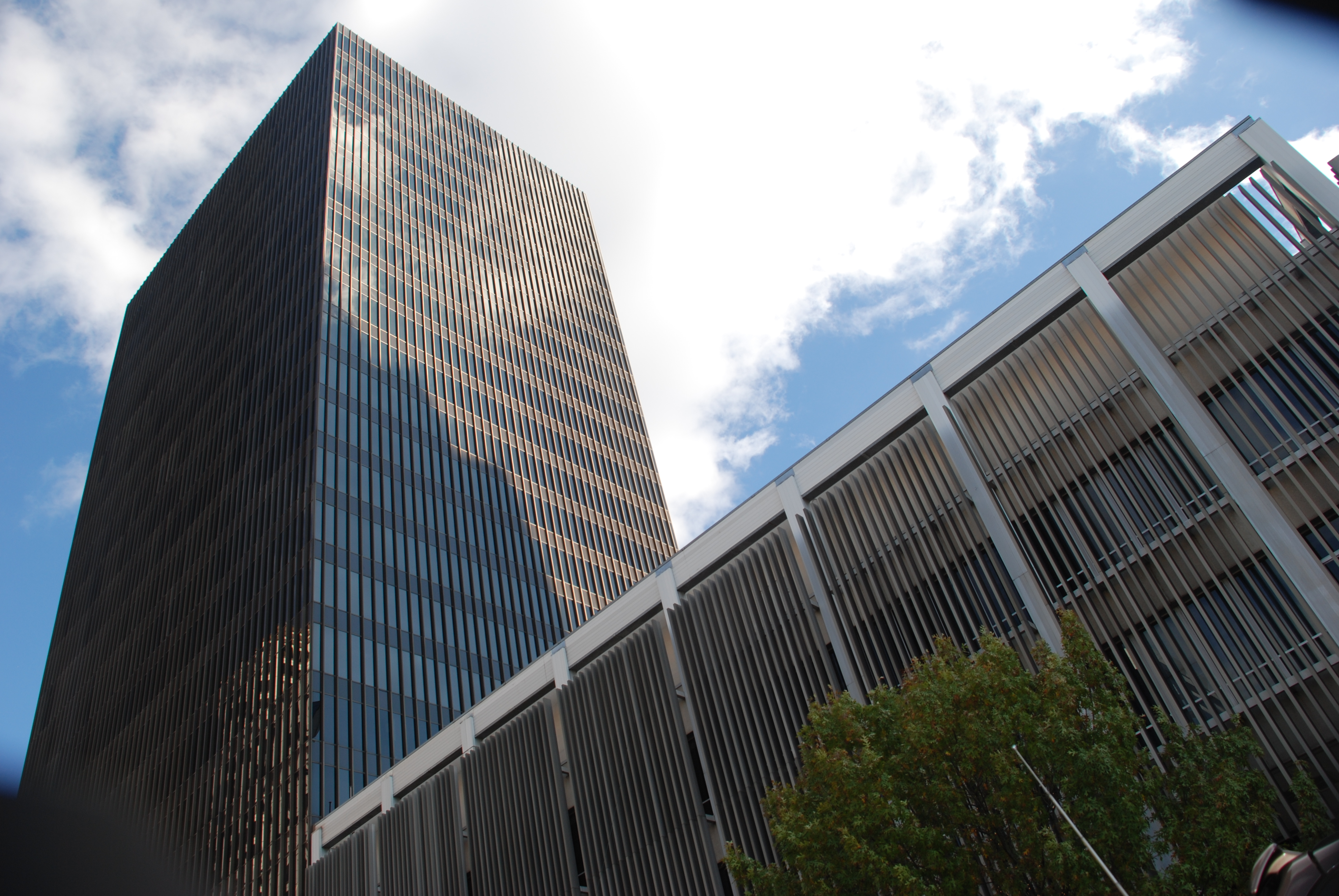
- Bank of America Center in 2007

General information
- Status: Completed
- Type: Office
- Location: 515 Congress Avenue, Austin, Texas, U.S.
- Completed: 1975
- Opening: 1975

Height
- Roof: 336 ft (102 m)

Technical details
- Floor count: 26 (+1 below-grade)
- Floor area: 261,609 sq ft (24,304.3 m^{2})

Design and construction
- Architect: S.I. Morris Associates
- Developer: Gerald D Hines Interests

The Bank of America Center is the 37th tallest building in Austin, Texas, United States. It was built in 1975 and has 261,609 square feet (24,304 m^{2}) of office space on 26 floors. It is 336 feet (102 m) tall and is located on the east side of Congress Avenue in downtown Austin between 5th and 6th Streets. The tower was the second building in Austin to surpass the Texas State Capitol in height, after the Chase Bank Tower. The Bank of America Center was the tallest building in Austin for 9 years from 1975 to 1984, surpassing the Chase Bank Tower but falling short of the One American Center. The building's facade was built with leftover material from Pennzoil Place in Houston.

== See also ==
- List of tallest buildings in Austin, Texas
