= The Bowie (Austin) =

General information
- Status: Completed
- Type: Residential, office, retail
- Architectural style: Modern
- Location: 311 Bowie St, Austin, TX, United States
- Construction started: 2012
- Completed: 2015
- Owner: State Board of Administration of Florida, L&B Realty Advisors
- Landlord: RPM Living

Height
- Height: 128.9 m (423 ft)

Technical details
- Floor count: 36
- Floor area: 520,000 sq ft of residential space

Design and construction
- Architecture firm: HKS Architects
- Developer: Endeavor Real Estate Group and Lynd Company
- Structural engineer: Brockette/Davis/Drake, Inc.
- Main contractor: Harvey Cleary Builders

The Bowie is a 36-story luxury high-rise apartment building in the Market District of downtown Austin, Texas. The tower stands approximately 423 feet (129 m) tall with 36 floors, and was completed in 2015. Developed by Austin-based Endeavor Real Estate Group in partnership with the Lynd Company of San Antonio, the project broke ground in 2012 and opened in late 2014. It features 358 residential units along with approximately 41,000 sq ft (3,800 m²) of office space and 4,000 sq ft (370 m²) of ground-floor retail. The Bowie was designed by HKS, Inc. architects and earned a LEED Silver certification for sustainability. In 2017, the building was sold in a record-setting transaction (on a per-unit and per-square-foot basis for Austin) as part of a Lynd-led portfolio disposition.

== Tenants and amenities ==
The Bowie’s office space, located on the 8th and 9th floors, was leased in 2014 to Whole Foods Market for expansion of its headquarters. Whole Foods employees began occupying the space in 2015. The building’s ground-level retail has included a coffee shop and other services catering to residents and the neighborhood.

Residential amenities at The Bowie include a rooftop infinity pool on the 36th floor, outdoor terraces on the 10th and 31st floors, a fitness center, a dog grooming room, and 24-hour concierge service. Due to its height and location near Shoal Creek, many units feature unobstructed views of downtown Austin, Lady Bird Lake, and the Texas State Capitol.

In its early years, The Bowie was the first headquarters of Bumble. From 2015 until mid-2017, Bumble operated out of a two-bedroom apartment in the building, despite the Bowie being zoned strictly for residential use. A BuzzFeed News exposé reported complaints from other residents over noise and inappropriate use of amenities. Bumble relocated to an office in downtown Austin later that year.

== Bowie Tenants Union ==
In 2025, residents of The Bowie formed the Bowie Tenants Union, an independent coalition advocating for renters’ rights and improved management practices in the building. The organization emerged in response to repeated water shutoffs, fire code concerns, and unresolved maintenance complaints. It is considered the first tenants’ union formed in a luxury high-rise in Austin.

The union has pressured the property manager, RPM Living, and the building’s ownership group (advised by L&B Realty Advisors and the Florida State Board of Administration) to comply with Texas renter protection statutes and improve communication with tenants.

== September 17, 2026 Electrical Fire ==
On September 17, 2026, The Bowie experienced an electrical fire on the 33rd floor, caused by overheating electrical equipment and wiring. The fire left the building without power and, since the high-rise plumbing relies on pumps, without water as well. Over 100 residents were displaced and had to find alternative accommodations in hotels or Airbnbs.

As of October 1, 2026, The Bowie remains without power and these residents remain displaced until at least October 23-31.

== See also ==
- List of tallest buildings in Austin, Texas
- List of tenant unions in the United States
