= The Ashton =

Residential skyscraper in Texas, United States

Coordinates: 30.26377°N 97.74585°W

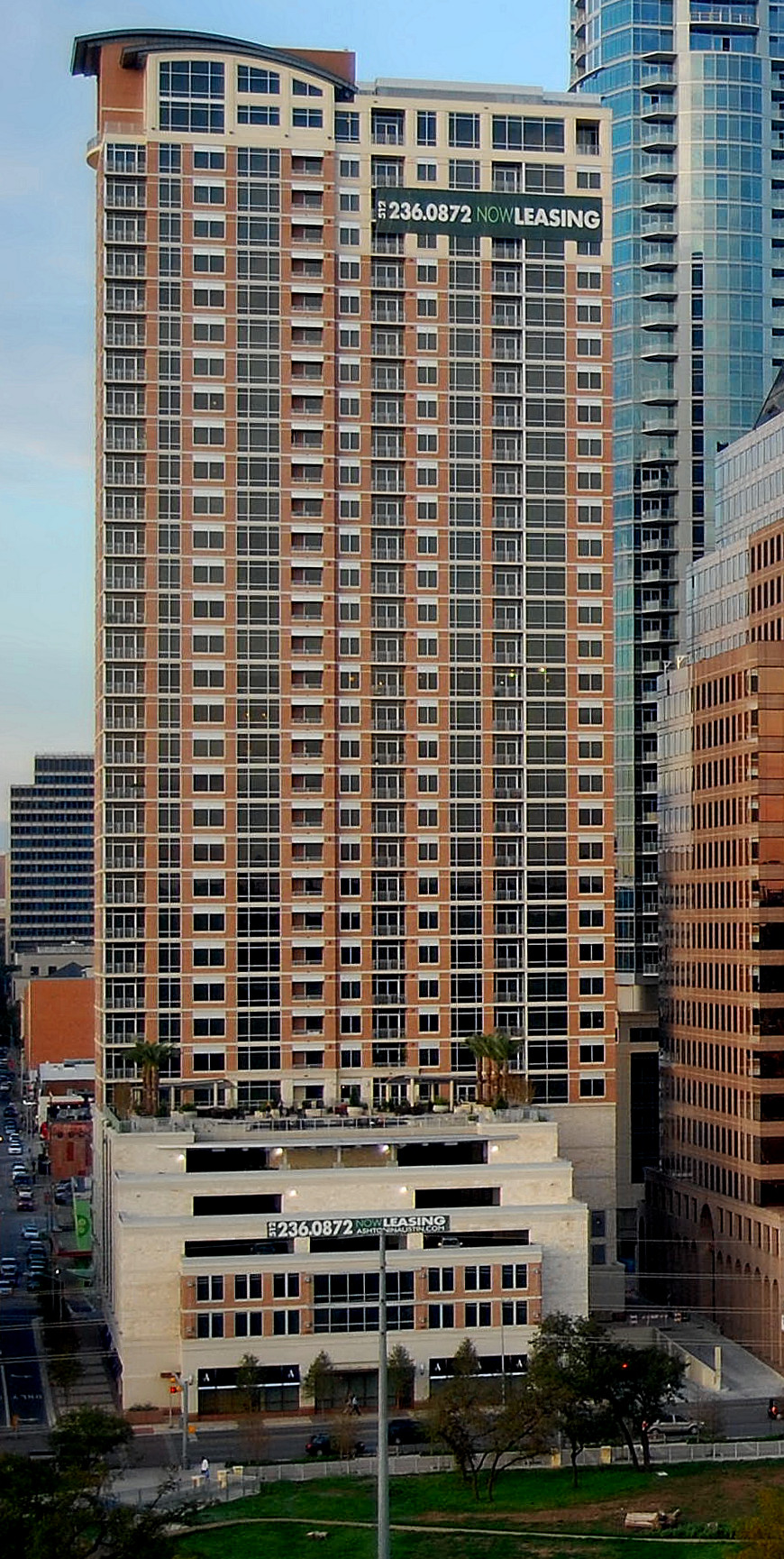
- The Ashton viewed from the south.
- Interactive map of the The Ashton area

General information
- Status: Completed
- Type: Residential
- Location: 101 Colorado Street; Austin, Texas
- Completed: 2009
- Opening: 2009

Height
- Roof: 126 m (413 ft)

Technical details
- Floor count: 36

Design and construction
- Architect: KTGY-GDA Architects
- Structural engineer: Garrett-Ihen Civil Engineer

The Ashton is a 36-story residential skyscraper located in Austin, Texas. Completed in 2009, with a design by KTGY's Dallas Studio (formerly known as GDA Architects, LLC), it is 412 feet (126 meters) high, making it the 18th tallest building in the city. The tower rises just 15 feet from its shorter neighbor to the east, 100 Congress. The Ashton was one of the first skyscrapers built in Austin during the city's 2006-2010 skyscraper boom. The building is notable for its extensive pool deck located atop the podium. The Ashton is the twin of a building of the same name in Dallas, Texas, though the Austin property is 16 stories taller.

== See also ==
- List of tallest buildings in Austin
