= Fairmont Austin =

Hotel in Austin, Texas, U.S.

Coordinates: 30.2621°N 97.7382°W

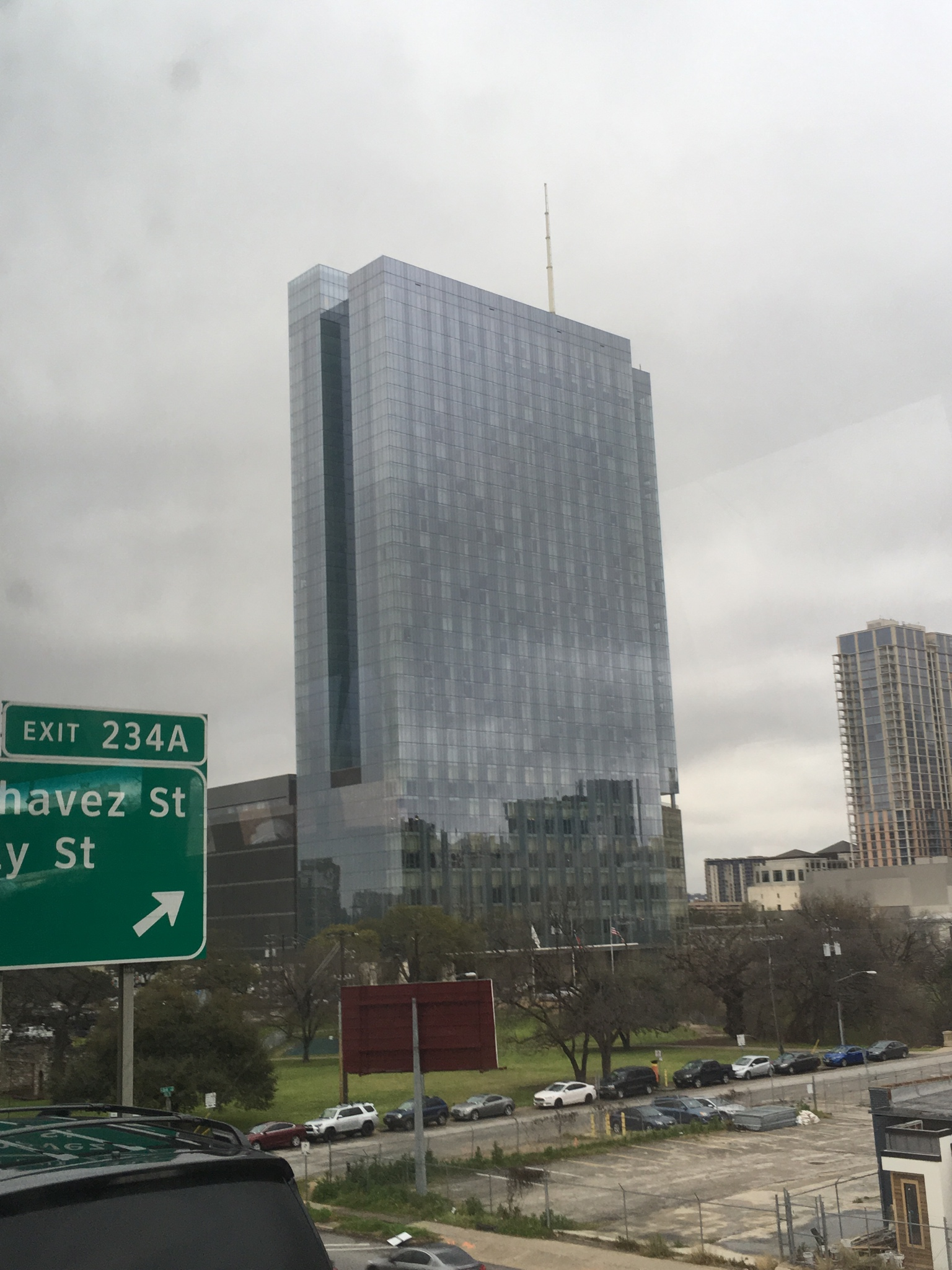
- Fairmont Austin in February 2019.
- Alternative names: Fairmont ATX

General information
- Status: Completed
- Type: Hospitality
- Location: 101 Red River Street, Austin, Texas, U.S.
- Construction started: 2013

Height
- Height: 595 ft (181 m)

Technical details
- Floor count: 37
- Floor area: 1,400,000 sq ft (130,000 m^{2})
- Lifts/elevators: 10

Design and construction
- Architecture firm: Gensler Austin
- Developer: Manchester Texas Financial Group
- Other designers: Warren Sheets Design, Inc.

Other information
- Number of units: 1048

The Fairmont Austin is a 37-story hotel located on 101 Red River St., in Downtown Austin, Texas, United States.Groundbreaking for the project began on November 3, 2014. The hotel, at 1,400,000 square feet (130,000 m^{2}), is the largest of the Fairmont hotel chain. The hotel tops out at 595 feet (181 m) tall, surpassing Austin's previous tallest hotel, the Hilton Austin Hotel. The Fairmont Austin also features a skyway connection to the Austin Convention Center.

The Fairmont Austin also features five restaurants: Good Things, a coffee shop with quick bites. Rules and Regs, the tapas bar and restaurant on the 7th floor pool deck. Revue, a multi outlet style restaurant modeled after a movie set. Fulton, a craft cocktail bar and restaurant, features live music each and every night. And finally, Garrison, a modern american, post oak, open flame, luxe dining experience.

== History ==
The groundbreaking for the Fairmont Austin was held on November 3, 2014. The hotel was expected to reach completion in late January to early February 2018 but was delayed until March 2018. The hotel opened on March 5, 2018, in time for South by Southwest.

== Architecture ==
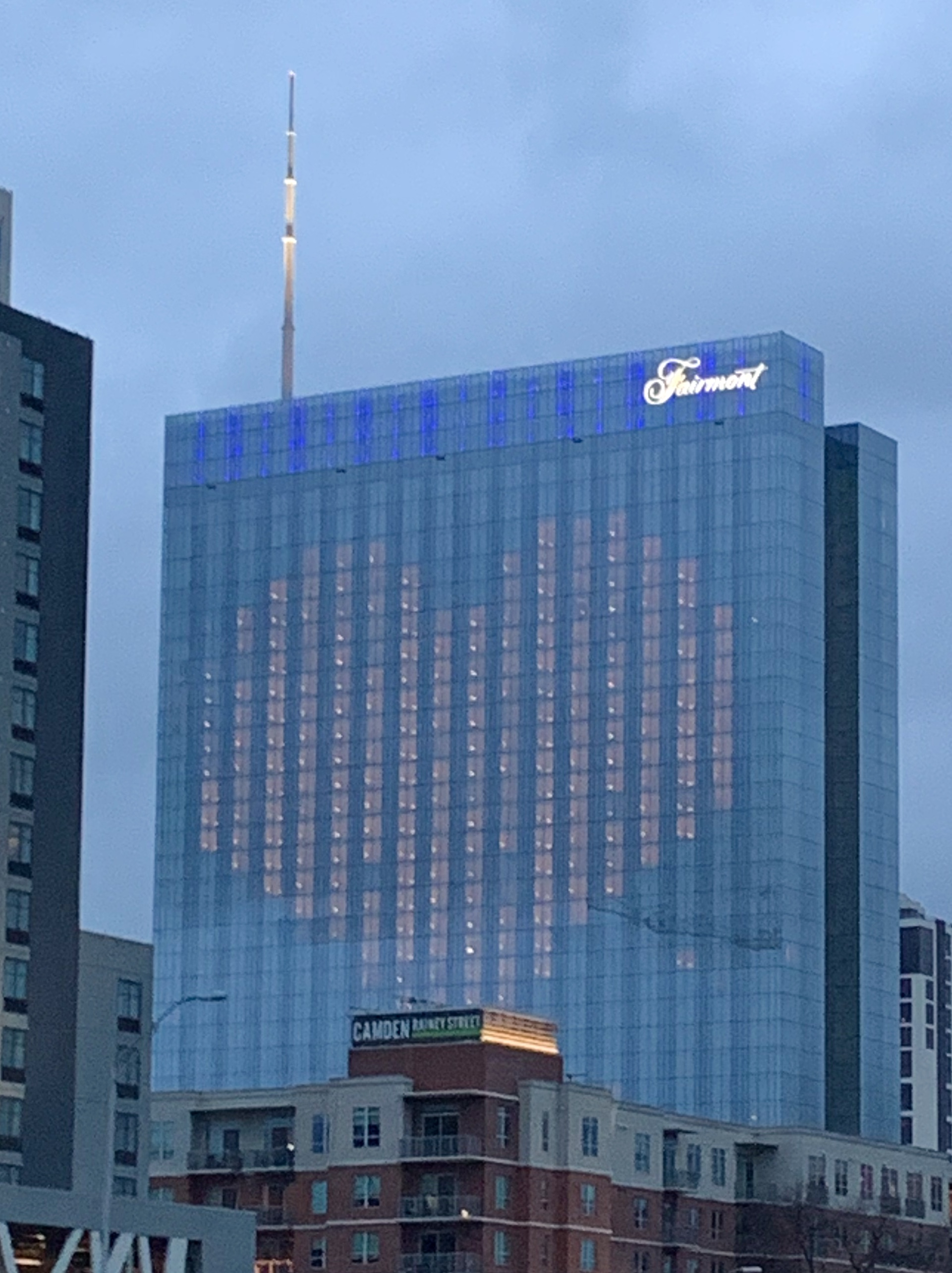
Room lighting arranged to form a heart in February 2020

The Fairmont Austin was designed by architecture firm Gensler, with interiors furnished by San Francisco-based interior designer Warren Sheets. The hotel features a $6 million 33-foot aerial skyway connecting to the Austin Convention Center, designed by Thomas Phifer.

The building is topped with a 170-foot lighted spire, the maximum height allowed by the Federal Aviation Administration. The building's crown features a band of color-changing LED lighting, which is often changed for holidays and special events. During periods of low occupancy, the hotel blocks off rooms on the southern side of the building and replaces the lighting in select rooms with color-changing LED bulbs to create images on the building's facade, including the Texas Longhorns logo during University of Texas games, a giant jack-o'-lantern for Halloween, and a wrapped present during Christmas.

== See also ==
- List of tallest buildings in Austin, Texas
