= One Eleven Congress =

Skyscraper in Austin Texas

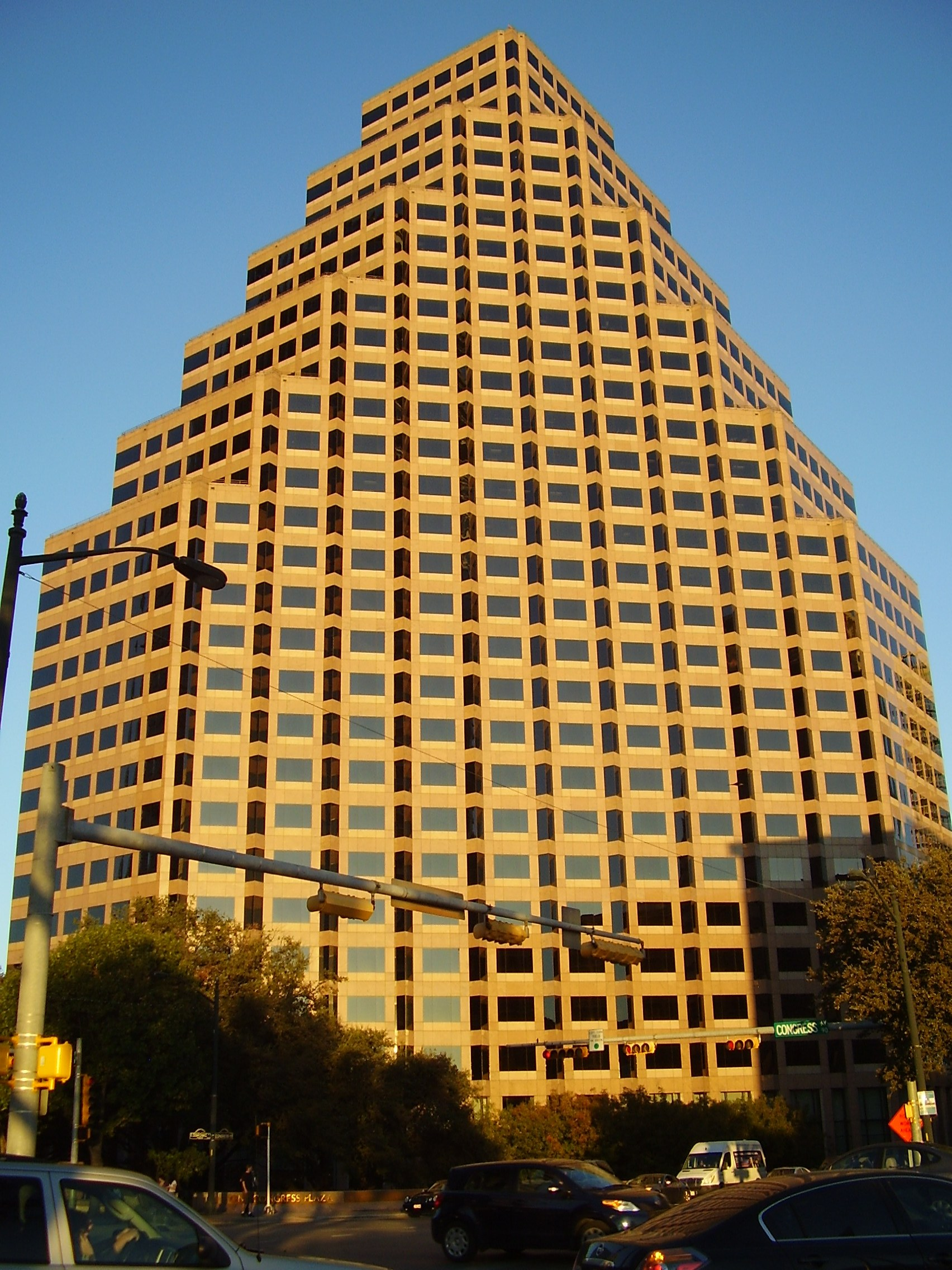
- One Eleven Congress viewed from the southwest.
- Interactive map of the One Eleven Congress area

General information
- Status: Completed
- Type: Office
- Location: 111 Congress Ave; Austin, Texas
- Coordinates: 30.2642°N 97.7448°W
- Completed: 1987
- Opening: 1987
- Owner: Cousins Properties

Height
- Roof: 397 ft (121 m)

Technical details
- Floor count: 30

Design and construction
- Architect: HKS, Inc.
- Developer: Vantage Bros.
- Main contractor: Charter Construction Co.

One Eleven Congress, formerly One Congress Plaza, is a skyscraper in Downtown Austin, the state capital of Texas in the United States. Standing 397 feet (121 meters) tall and containing 30 floors, the building is the 23rd tallest in Austin. The building contains a sunken plaza, which include trees, a food hall, water features, and park benches, as well as the location for the AMOA Art Show.

Built in 1987, the building was one of the skyscrapers built during the 1970s and 1980s boom Austin had at the time, and still is one of Austin's most famous buildings. Norwest Plaza, Franklin Federal Plaza, and One Congress Plaza have been former names for One Eleven Congress. One Eleven Congress has many setbacks from Congress Avenue to meet the requirements of a 1931 height restriction.

The building is owned by Cousins Properties of Atlanta, Georgia. One Eleven Congress has 548,823 square feet (50,987.3 m^{2}) of space and is one of Austin's waterfront skyscrapers.

== History ==
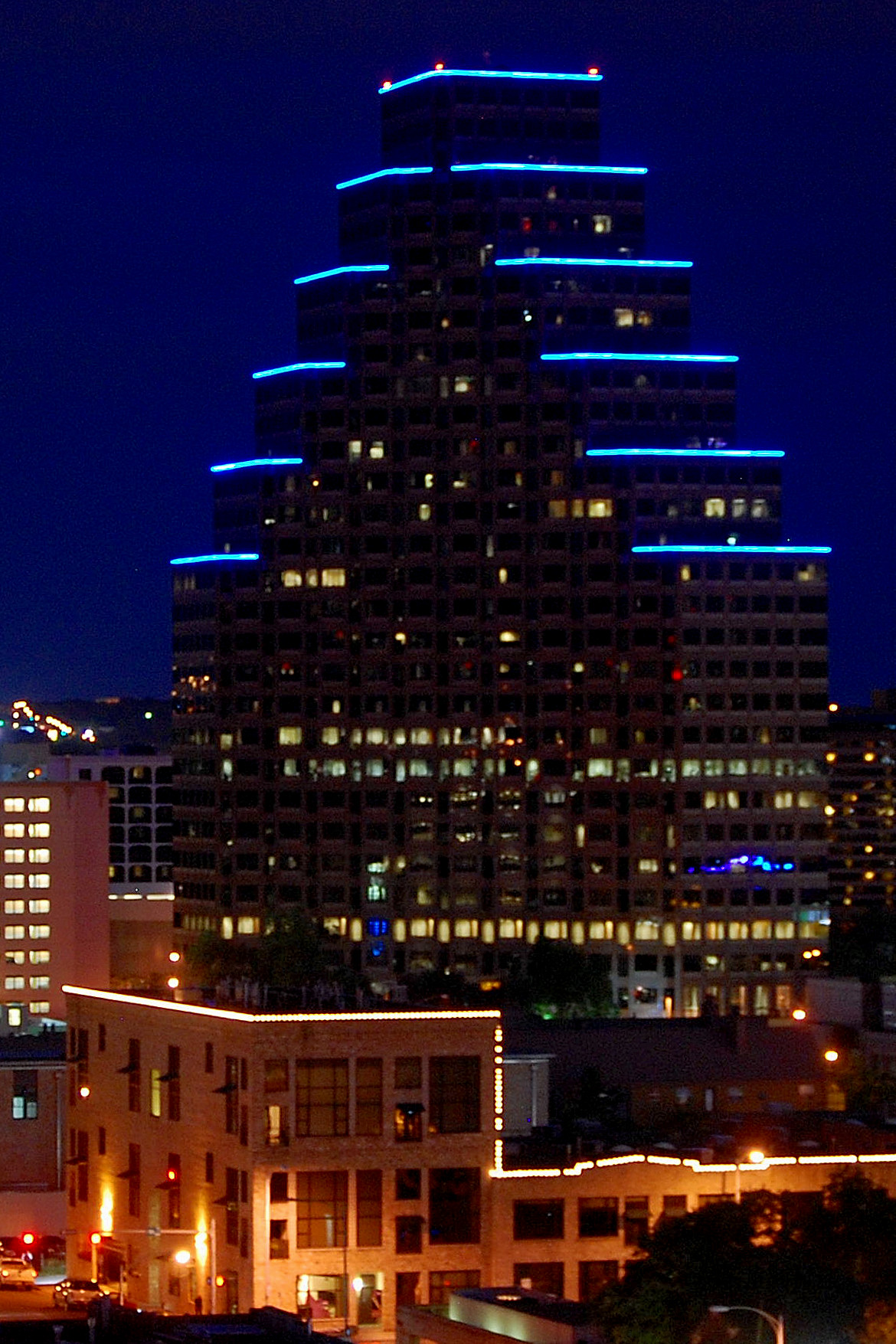
One Eleven Congress at night

One Eleven Congress was opened in 1987, developed by Dallas-based Vantage Bros. in a joint venture with Austin-based Carpenter Development and the Prospect Company of Dallas. Originally, a 15-story, 20,000 square foot hotel tower was to be built on the northwest side of the building, connected via a glass atrium. The building would have stepped down towards Congress Avenue creating stairs to the first setback on One Eleven Congress; this project was put on hold and eventually canceled.

In 2017, the building was rebranded to One Eleven Congress, and the lobby and outdoor plaza were renovated. The lower level of the lobby was transformed into a food hall called "Fareground", which features a number of Austin-based food vendors, along with a bar. The outdoor plaza was revamped to include astroturf grassy hills, new seating, and native landscaping. The transformation also included a new water feature consisting of a 12 sculptural stainless steel poles, ranging from 20 feet to 30 feet tall. The poles emit a mist that is harvested from the condensation collected from the building's air conditioning system.

== Architecture ==
One Eleven Congress was designed by the architect Victor A. Lundy and HKS, Inc. along with an interior designed by Susman Tisdale Gayle Architects. The building's facade is clad in red granite and bronze-tinted glass. Designed in a step-like pyramid shape, the tops of each "step" are lined in blue neon lighting, making the building a distinctive addition to the nighttime skyline. The lobby's ceiling is adorned in patterned Burmese teak. The building's parking garage, located across Brazos Street, is connected to the building via a tunnel and includes a Baylor Scott & White clinic on the ground floor. On the north side of the building is a Wells Fargo bank branch with drive-thru lanes.

== Gallery ==
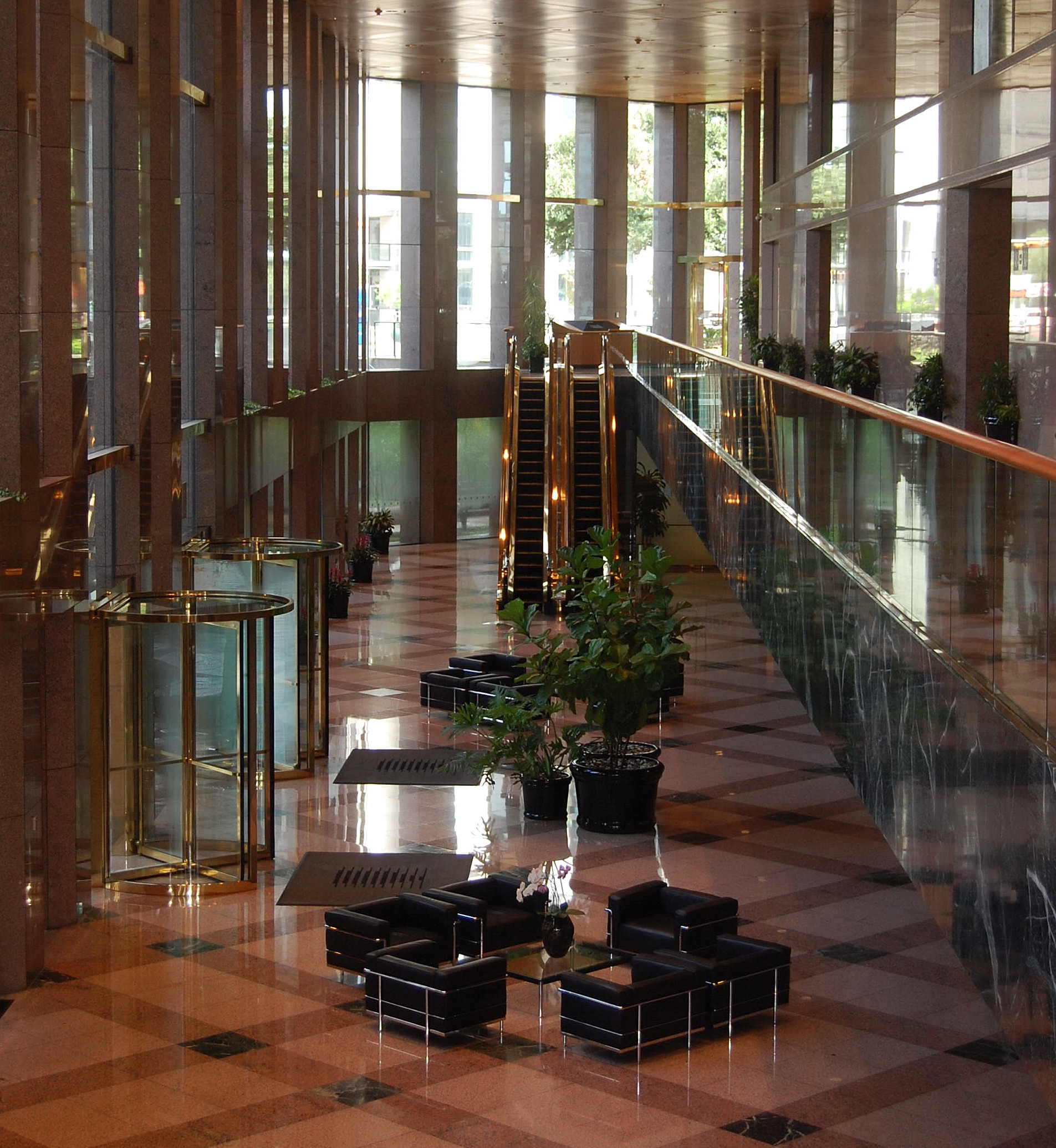
The lobby in 2010 prior to renovation

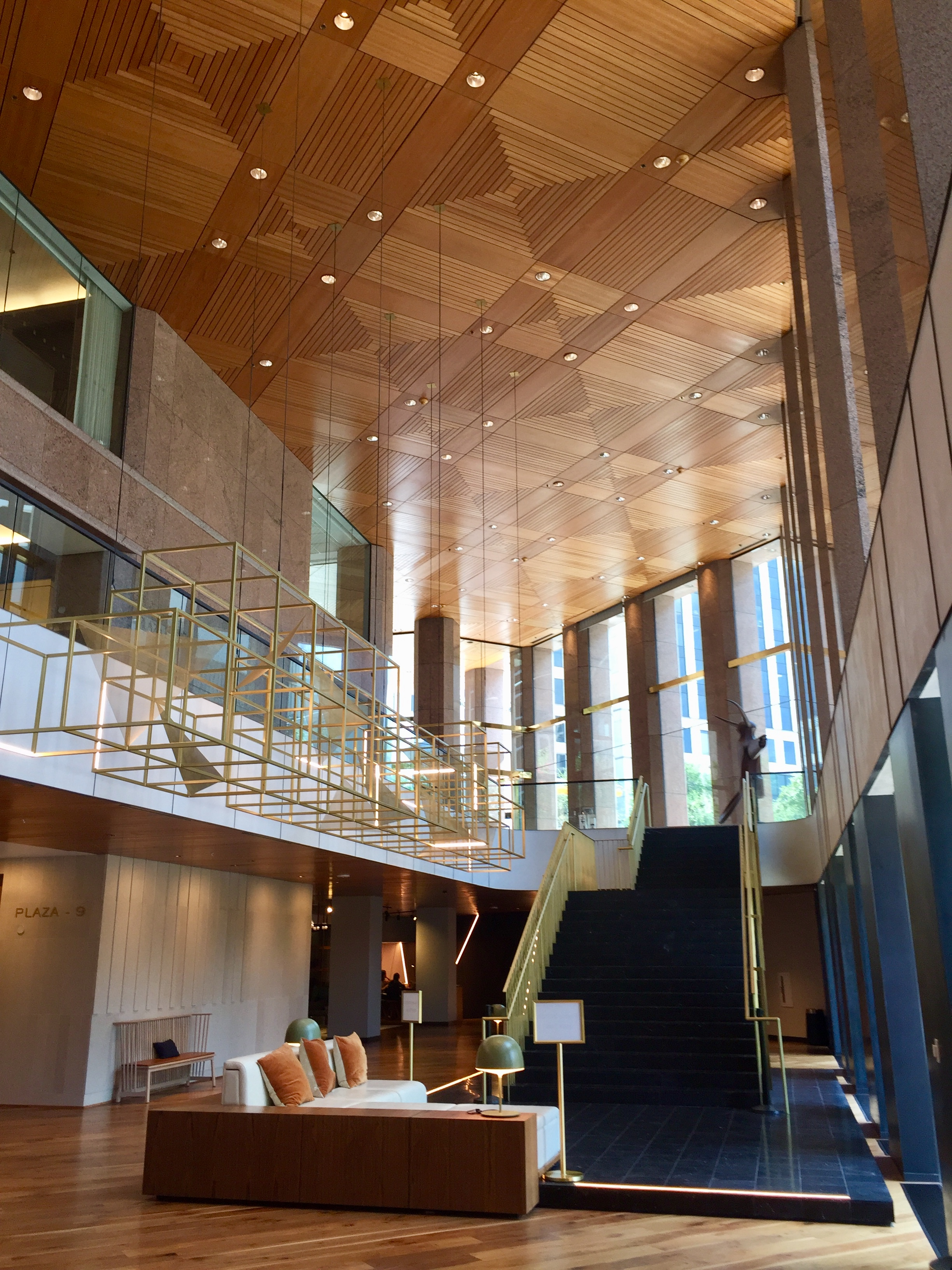
The lobby in 2018

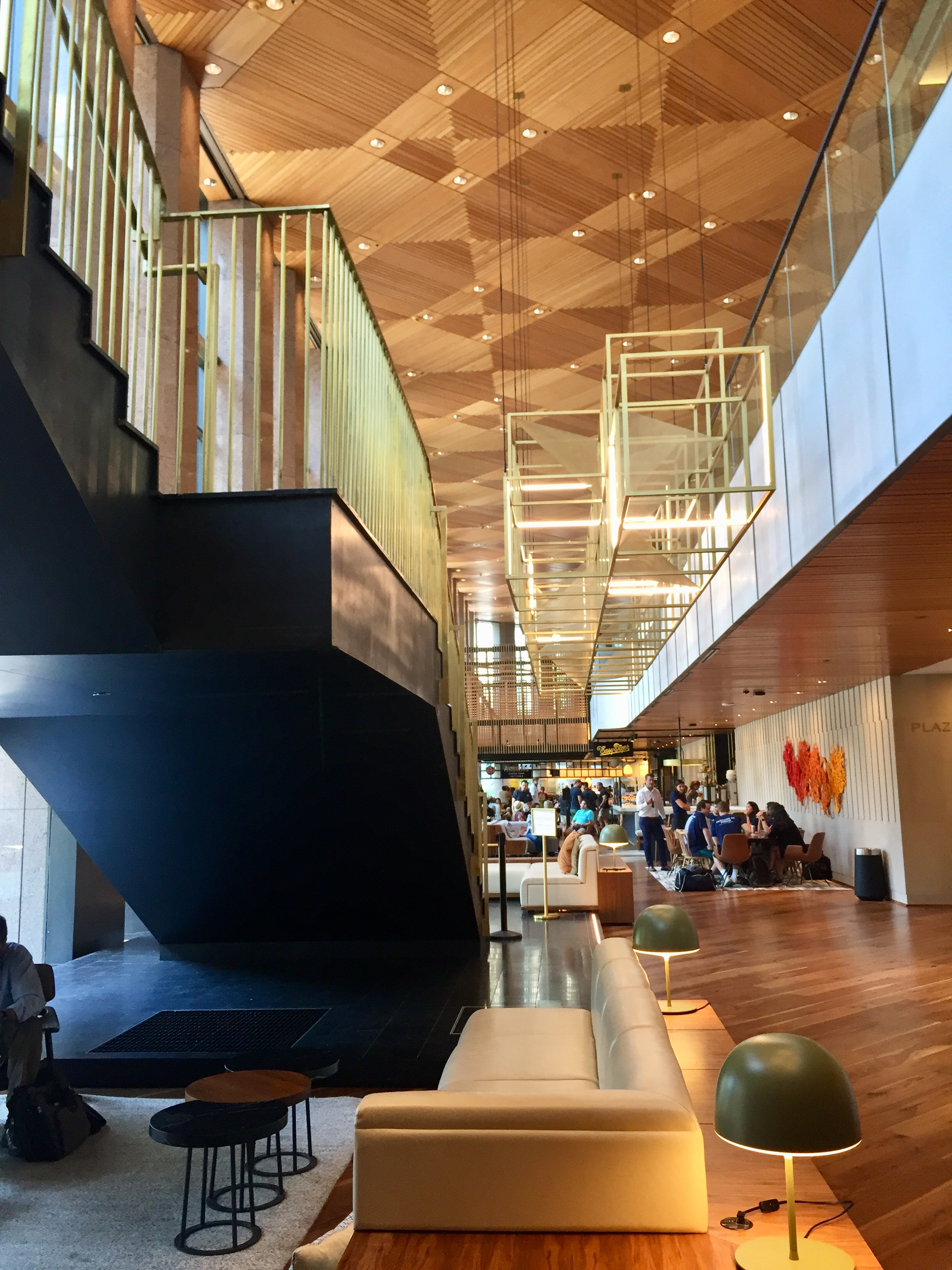
Fareground food hall on the lobby's first floor in 2018

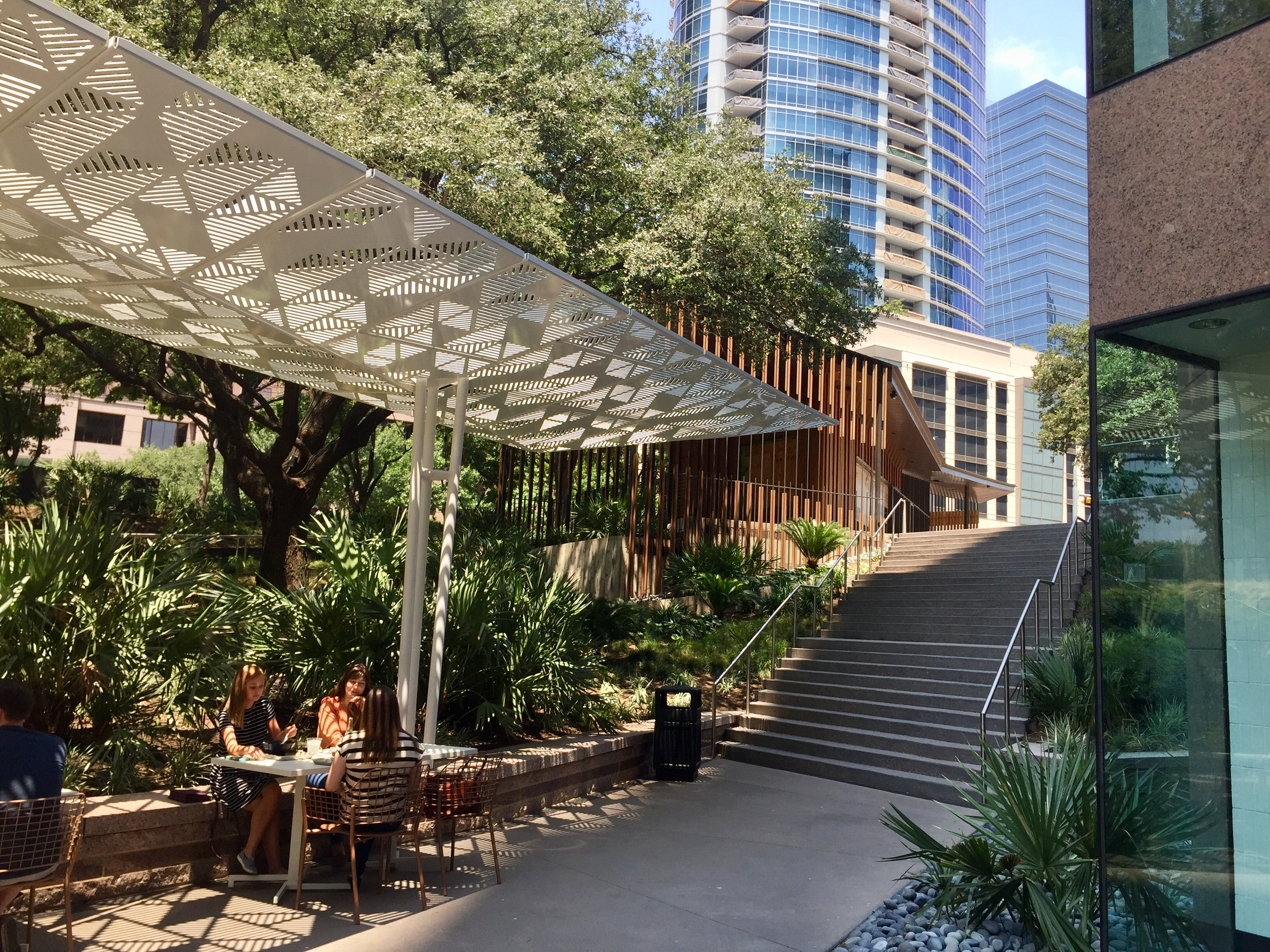
The sunken plaza facing North
