= 360 Condominiums =

High-rise condominium in Austin, Texas, U.S.

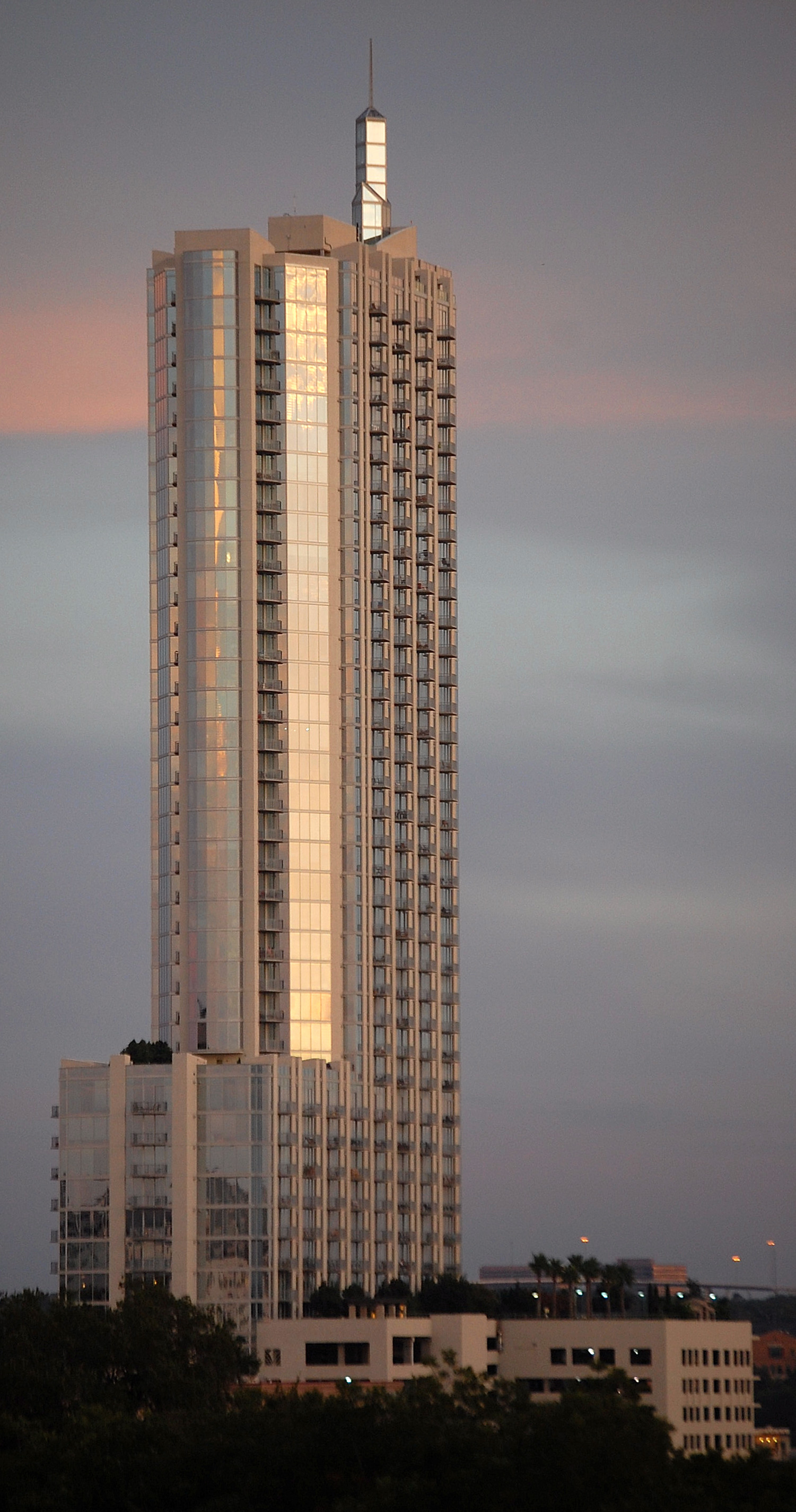
- View from ACC garage on 12th Street

General information
- Status: Completed
- Type: Residential
- Location: 360 Nueces Street, Austin, Texas, U.S.
- Coordinates: 30.267464°N 97.749556°W
- Construction started: June 20, 2006
- Completed: 2008
- Opening: May 22, 2008

Height
- Antenna spire: 581 ft (177 m)
- Roof: 472 ft (144 m)

Technical details
- Floor count: 44
- Lifts/elevators: 5

Design and construction
- Architect: Preston Partnership LLC
- Developer: Billy Holley and Judd Bobilin of Novare Group; Andrews Urban LLC
- Structural engineer: Echelon Engineering LLC
- Main contractor: J.E. Dunn Construction

The 360 Residential Condominiums skyscraper is located in Downtown Austin, Texas, United States, at 360 Nueces Street. The building itself stands 581 ft (177 m) tall with 44 floors, 430 condos, and over 14,000 ft^{2} (1,300 m^{2}) of retail space. The building topped out in November 2007, and construction was officially completed on May 22, 2008. 360 Condominiums was the tallest building in Austin from January 15, 2008, to June 29, 2009, when The Austonian surpassed it. The tower also became the tallest residential tower in Texas, surpassing The Merc in Dallas before the Austonian also took that title. Currently, it is the fourth tallest building in Austin after The Independent, The Austonian, and the Fairmont Austin.

The Austin 360 Condominiums Tower was developed by Billy Holley and Judd Bobilin of Novare Group and Andrews Urban LLC, designed by Preston Partnership LLC, sales managed by Kevin McDaniel and built by JE Dunn Construction. It features a pronounced setback at the sixteenth story, to avoid obstructing a Capitol View Corridor.

== History ==
The building was first proposed by the Atlanta, Georgia-based Novare Group and Austin based Andrews Urban LLC in 2006 as a 520 ft (158 m) 40 storied tower. However, as an attempt to increase units, more floors were added. Construction began on June 20, 2006, after the plan was approved. Floors were added at a fairly steady pace from the first to sixteenth floors, when the terrace level was reached on April 20, 2007, nearly a year after construction started. Activity slowed, but then quickened after the setback floor was finished. Spire assembly started on November 14 and was affixed in position 6 days later. This made the tower officially taller than its predecessor, the Frost Bank Tower. The building was finally complete in 2008. After nearly 2 years of construction, 360 Condominiums opened on May 22, 2008.

== Amenities ==
As with most other condominiums, 360 Condominiums contains many amenities, located within the tower and the terrace located 174 ft (53 m) above the ground. Amenities include a swimming pool, a sundeck, theater, and clubroom.

== Gallery ==
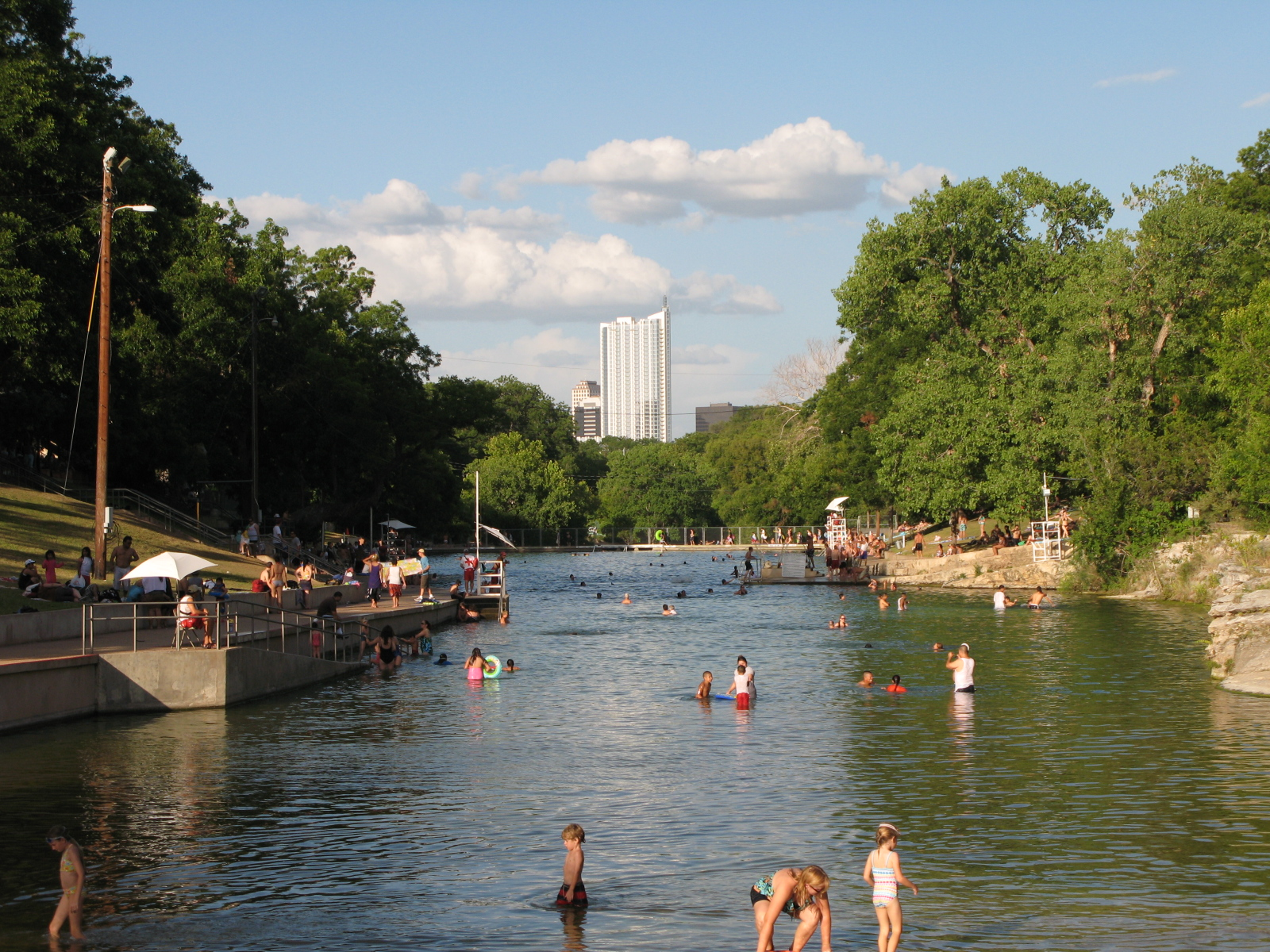
Barton Springs Pool with 360 in the distance

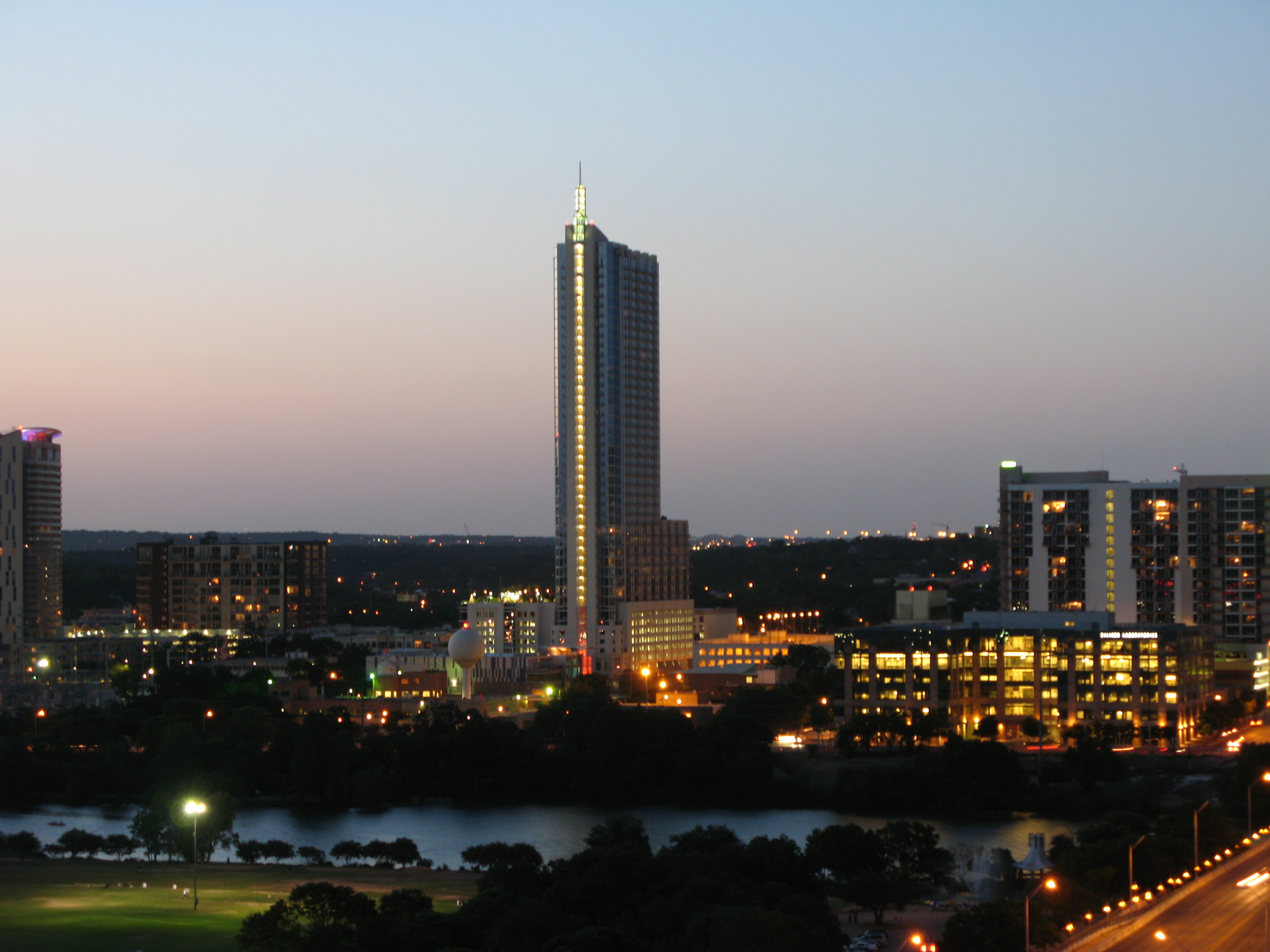
360 Condominiums looking out over Town Lake

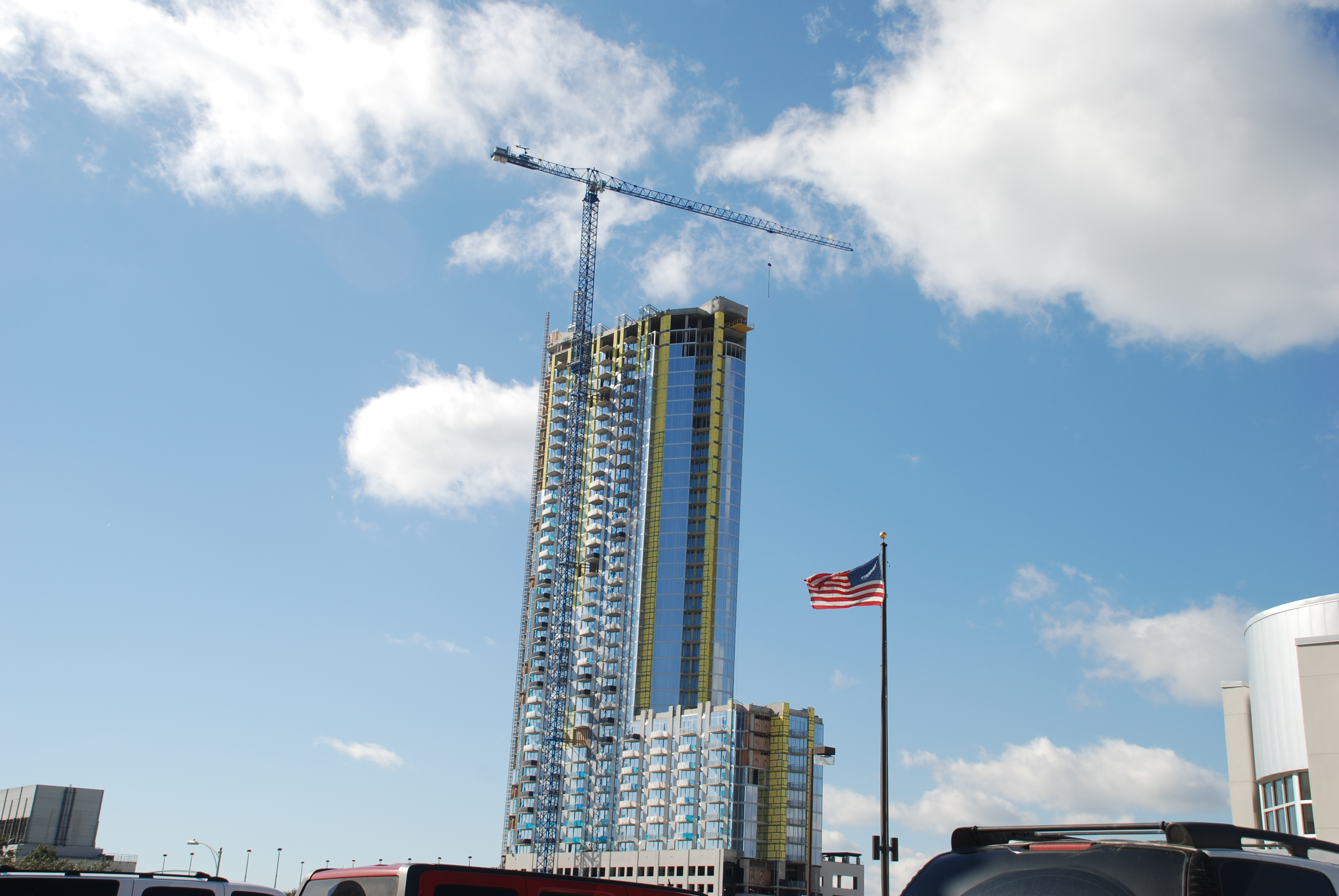
360 Condominiums topped out in December 2007

== See also ==
- List of tallest buildings in Austin
- List of tallest buildings in Texas

Preceded by Frost Bank Tower	Tallest Building in Austin; 2008—2009; 172m	Succeeded by The Austonian
