= The Northshore =

Skyscraper in Austin Texas

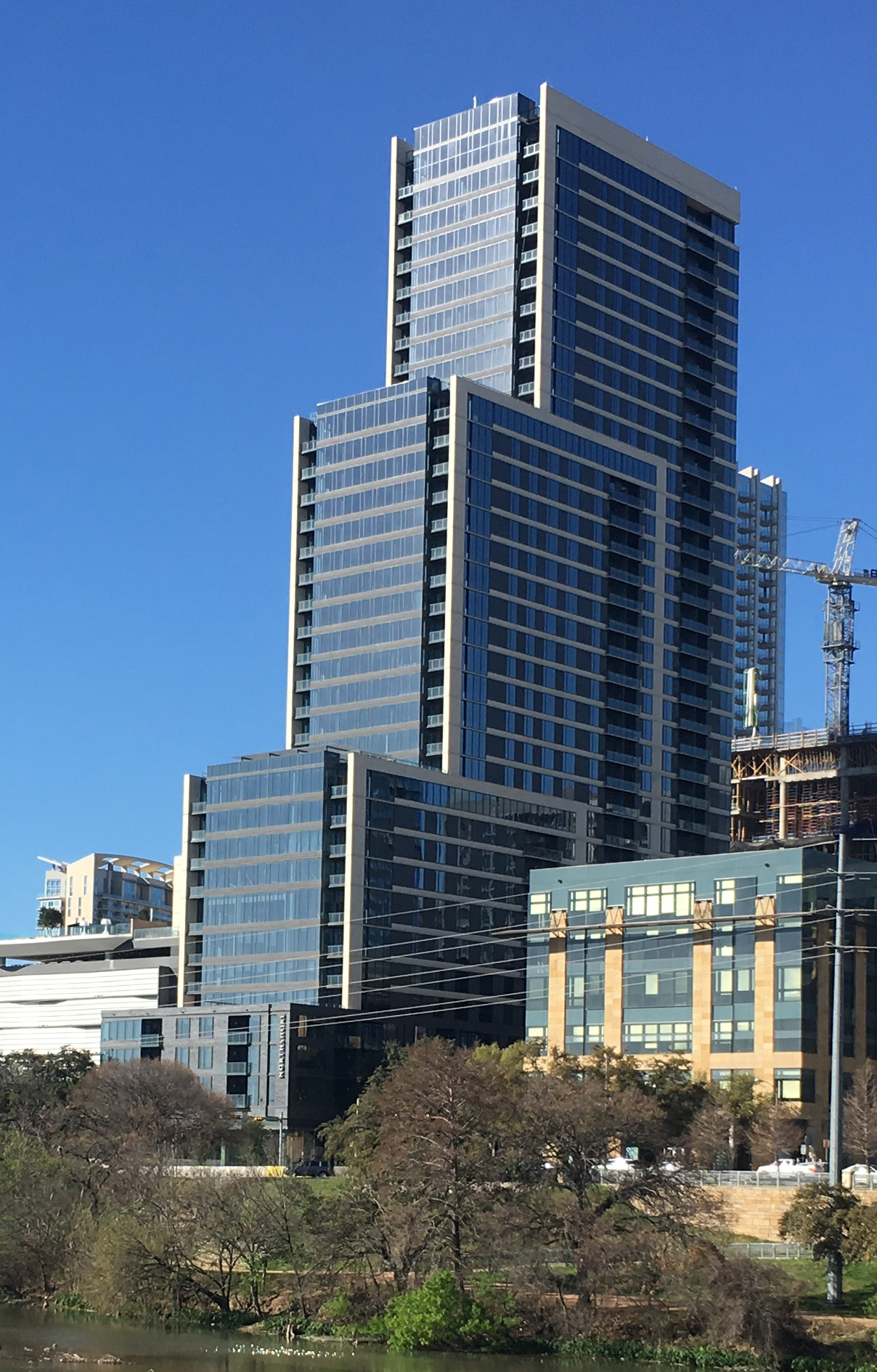
- The Northshore in March 2016
- Interactive map of the The Northshore area

General information
- Status: Completed
- Type: Residential
- Location: 110 San Antonio Street; Austin
- Coordinates: 30.265311°N 97.74952°W
- Construction started: 2014
- Completed: September 2015
- Opening: 2016

Height
- Roof: 424 ft (129 m)
- Top floor: 392 ft (119 m)

Technical details
- Floor count: 38

Design and construction
- Architect: SCB
- Developer: Trammell Crow Company, The Hanover Company

The Northshore is a mixed-use building in Austin, Texas that includes 439 residential units and 40,000 square feet of retail and office space. Co-Working company Galvanize occupies the office space in the building. Greystar manages the 439 residential units. As of 2019, the tower stands as the 15th tallest building in Austin, Texas. The building is the tallest apartment building in the city. The Northshore is part of the redevelopment of the former Green Water Treatment Plant site in downtown Austin.

The tower was originally planned to have a twin on neighboring Block 185, but the plan was reduced in scope to the single tower on Block 1 in 2014. Block 185 began construction in 2019, as a different design.

== See also ==
- List of tallest buildings in Austin, Texas
- List of tallest buildings in Texas
- List of tallest buildings in the United States
