= The Austonian =

Residential high-rise in Austin, Texas, U.S.

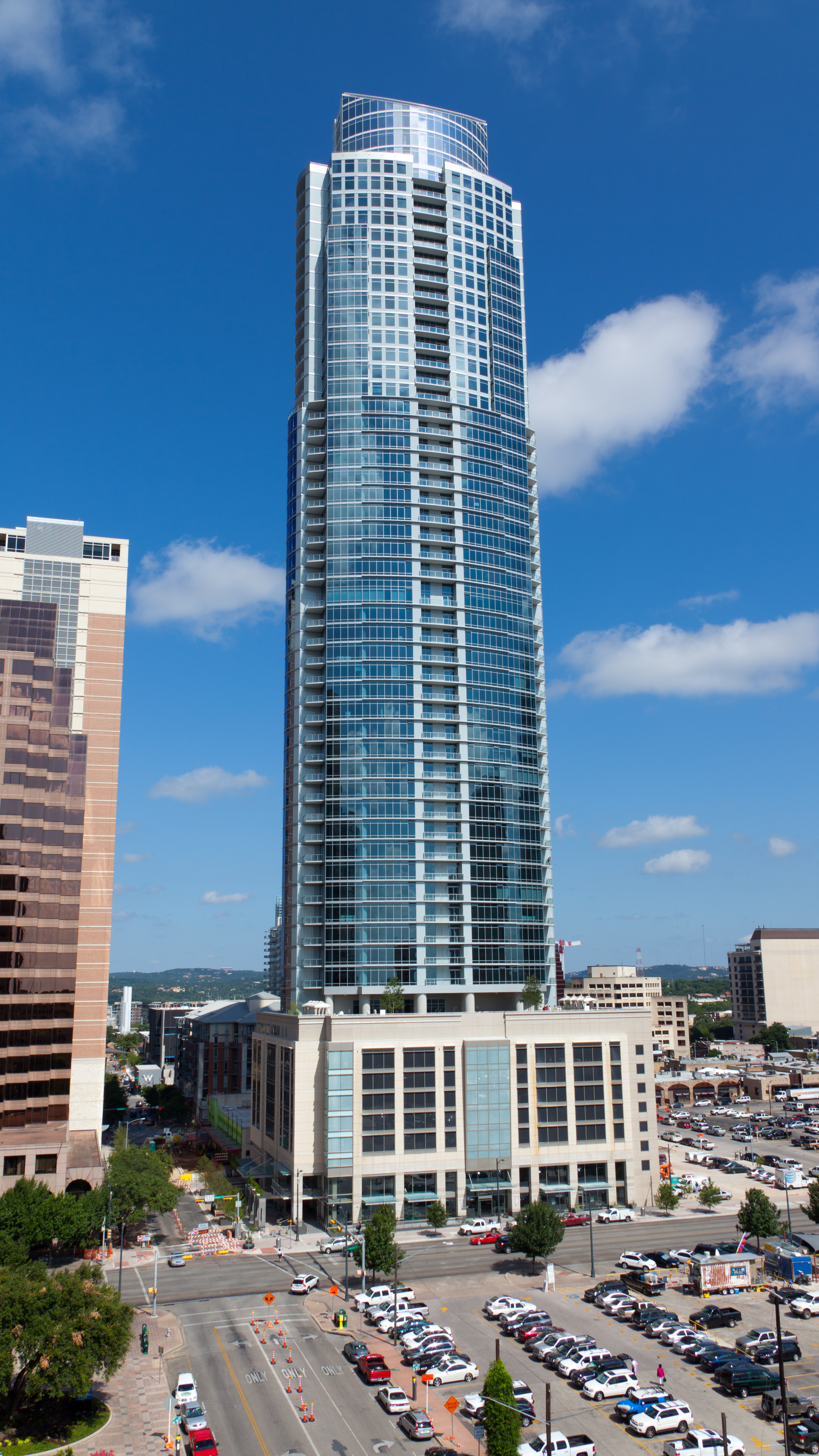
- The Austonian

Record height
- Tallest in Austin from 2009 to 2019^{[I]}
- Preceded by: 360 Condominiums
- Surpassed by: The Independent

General information
- Status: Completed
- Type: Residential
- Location: 200 Congress Avenue, Austin, Texas, U.S.
- Coordinates: 30.264781°N 97.744461°W
- Construction started: August 31, 2007
- Completed: 2010
- Opening: June 2010
- Cost: Approx. $250 million
- Owner: Benchmark Development

Height
- Antenna spire: 683 ft (208 m)
- Roof: 683 ft (208 m)
- Top floor: 670 ft (204 m)

Technical details
- Floor count: 56
- Floor area: 590,870 square feet (54,890 m^{2})

Design and construction
- Architect: Ziegler Cooper Architects
- Developer: Benchmark Land Development
- Structural engineer: CBM Engineers
- Main contractor: Balfour Beatty Construction

Website
- www.theaustonian.com

The Austonian is a residential skyscraper in Downtown Austin, Texas, United States. At 683 feet (208 m) tall with 56 floors, the building is the third tallest in Austin, overtaking the 360 Condominiums and behind The Independent and Sixth and Guadalupe. It is also the third tallest building in Texas outside of Houston and Dallas, and the second tallest all-residential building in North America west of the Mississippi River.

== History ==
The Austonian's groundbreaking ceremony took place on August 31, 2007. On June 4, 2009, the 47th floor of the Austonian was poured, meaning the Austonian surpassed the Frost Bank Tower to become the second-tallest building in Austin, Texas. On July 1, 2009, The Austonian overtook 360 Condominiums to become the tallest building in Austin. The building's exterior was finished in 2010, a period of almost 2.5 years since its groundbreaking.

The Austonian opened to host the 2010 Women's Symphony League Designer Showhouse the weekend of May 15–16, 2010. The Showhouse was the last opportunity for the public to see the property before residents began moving into the building in June 2010. The Austonian received a four-star rating from Austin Energy Green Building in November 2010, making it the only residential high-rise building in Downtown Austin to receive such a rating.

In 2015, after a number of concrete spalls had fallen from balconies, it was discovered that the balconies had been constructed improperly—water was able to get into the steel rebar, causing it to rust and expand, due to the steel rebar being too close to the outside edge of the concrete slab. Repairs were estimated to cost over $13 million, and were completed in 2019.

== See also ==
- List of tallest buildings in Austin
- List of tallest buildings in Texas

Preceded by 360 Condominiums	Tallest building in Austin; 2009–2019; 208 m	Succeeded by The Independent
Preceded by Tower of the Americas	Tallest building in Texas outside of Dallas and Houston; 2009–2019; 208 m	Succeeded by The Independent
