= Hilton Austin Hotel =

American skyscrapers

Coordinates: 30.2652°N 97.7382°W

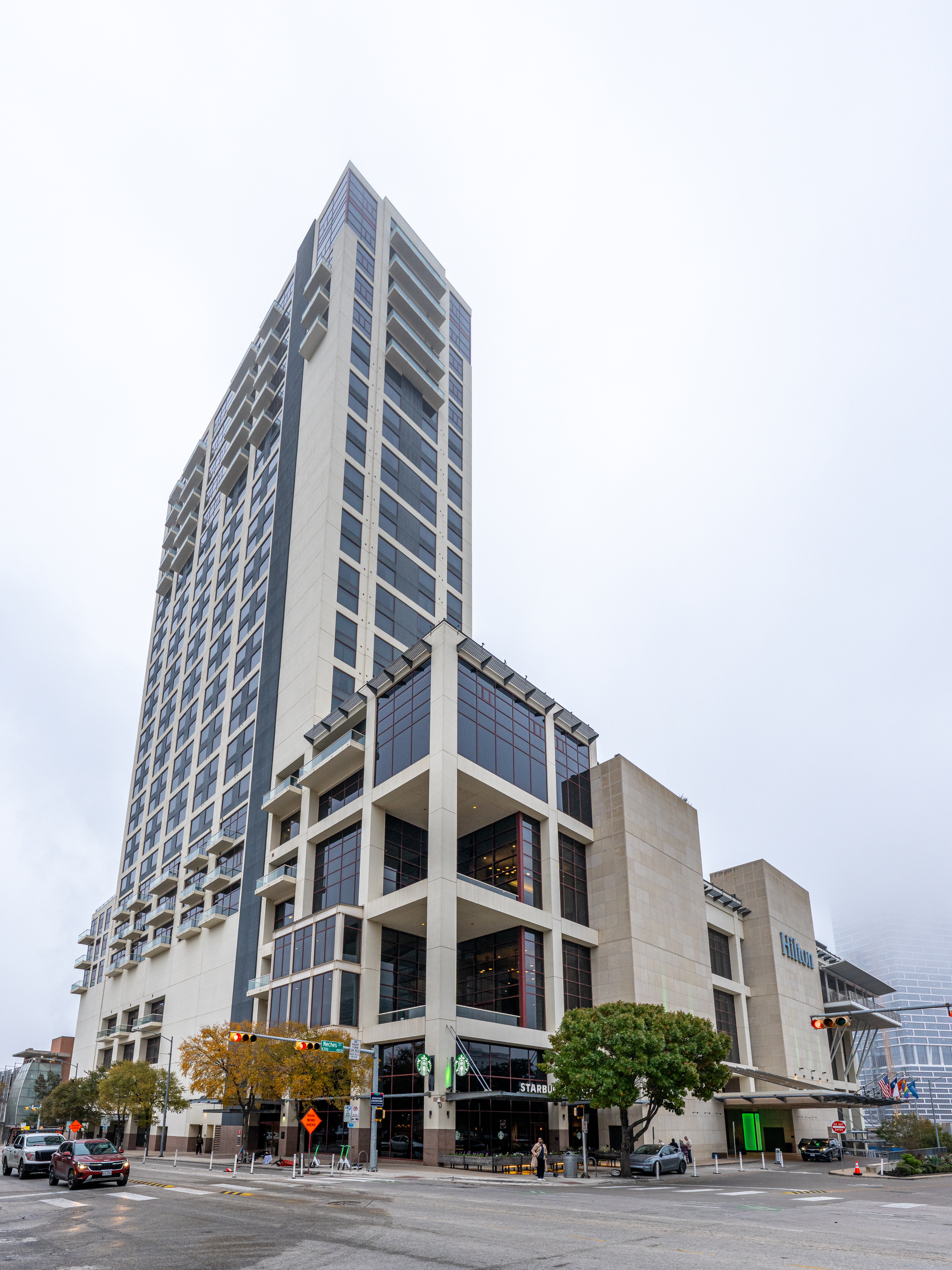
- Building from the west (2025)
- Interactive map of the Hilton Austin Hotel area

General information
- Status: Completed
- Type: Hotel
- Location: 555 East 5th Street; Austin, Texas
- Construction started: July 10, 2001
- Completed: 2003
- Opening: 2003
- Owner: Hilton

Height
- Roof: 115 m (377 ft)

Technical details
- Floor count: 31

Design and construction
- Architects: Ellerbe Becket Inc, Susman Tisdale Gayle Architects (now STG Design, Inc)

The Hilton Austin Hotel is the third largest hotel in Austin, with 801 rooms. The Hilton Austin is also the sixth tallest hotel and thirty-eighth tallest building in Austin, Texas at 377 ft (115 m) tall with 26 stories. Designed by Ellerbe Becket Inc and Susman Tisdale Gayle Architects (now STG Design, Inc), the building broke ground on July 10, 2001, and topped out officially on January 17, 2003, a span of 1 year, 6 months, and 7 days. In 2018, a $7.5 million overhead walkway was constructed to connect the sixth floor of the hotel with the fourth floor of the Austin Convention Center.

The tower began an exterior renovation in early 2018. The tower's sand-colored facade was painted white, with black paint added between windows.

== See also ==
- List of tallest buildings in Austin, Texas
- List of tallest buildings in Texas
- List of tallest buildings in the United States
