= Rainey Street Historic District =

Historic house in Texas, United States

- U.S. National Register of Historic Places
- U.S. Historic district
- Location within Texas Location within the United States
- Location: Austin, Texas
- Coordinates: 30°15′34″N 97°44′18″W
- Built: 1875-1945
- NRHP reference No.: 85002302
- Added to NRHP: September 17, 1985

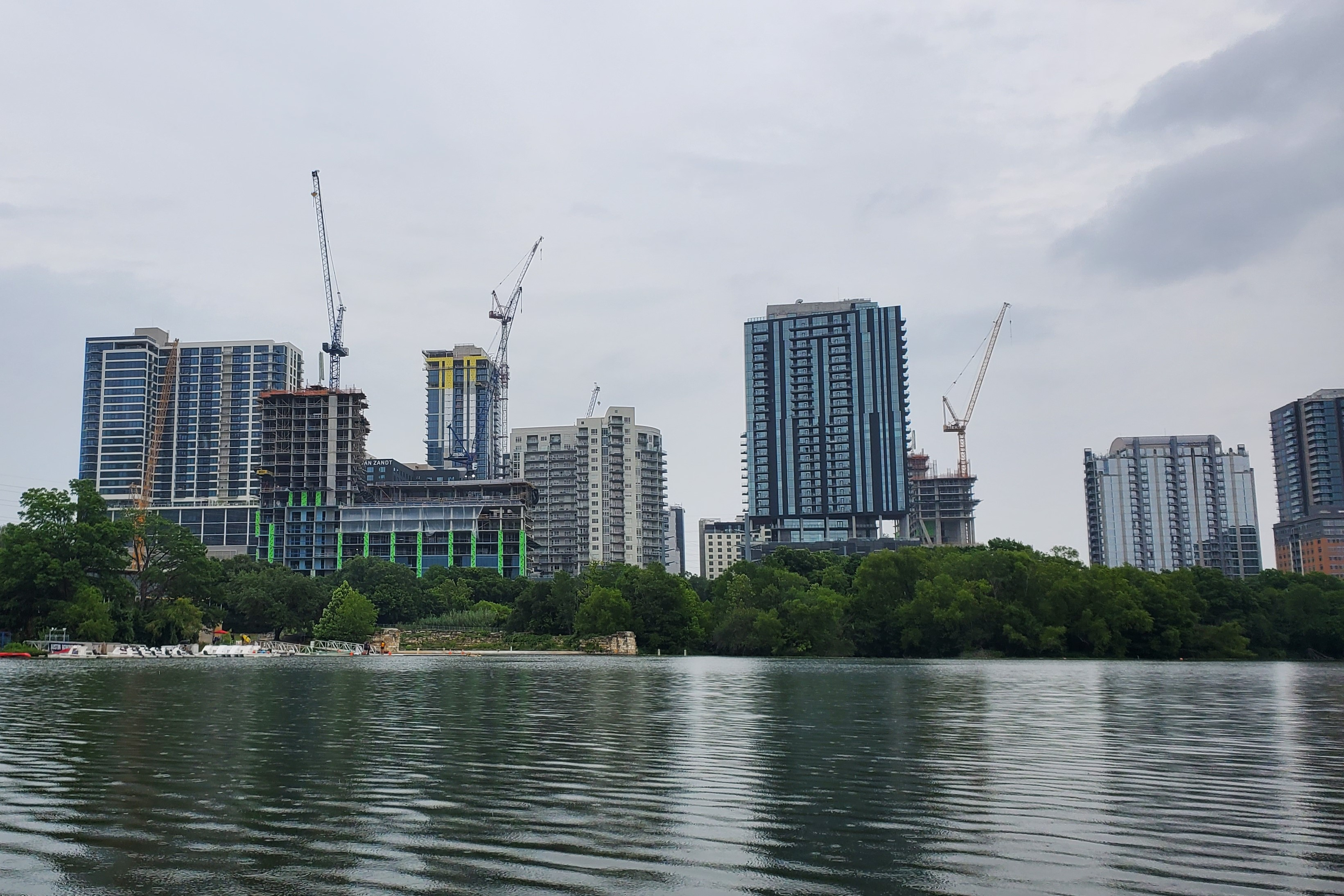
Several high-rise buildings under construction in Rainey Street in 2023, showcasing the rapid redevelopment the district has undergone.

The Rainey Street Historic District is a street of historic homes, many of the bungalow style, in downtown Austin, Texas.

Rainey Street is positioned near Lady Bird Lake and Interstate 35 in the southeast corner of downtown. Though 21 buildings are specifically identified as a part of the historic district, the stretch of Rainey between River and Driskill includes 31 buildings built before 1934, giving the neighborhood a historic character relative to other areas of the city. The district includes 120 acres (0.49 km^{2}) from 70 to 97 Rainey Street. It was added to the National Register of Historic Places in 1985. Since the early 2010s, the formerly sleepy residential street has turned into a popular nightlife district. Much of the historic homes have been renovated into bars and restaurants, many of which feature large porches and outdoor yards for patrons.

== History ==
The Rainey Street neighborhood was first developed in 1884 by cattle baron Jesse Driskill and Frank Rainey, who subdivided 16 acres of land between the Colorado River and Water Street (now known as Cesar Chavez Blvd.) The neighborhood was initially populated by white, middle class tradesman, though by the 1920s the area began to see a larger influx of working class families and ethnic minorities. Many of the original homes in the neighborhood were lost in a flood in 1935. The construction of Interstate 35 left the Rainey Street neighborhood "isolated" from the remainder of Austin's residential neighborhoods; by 1978, a report estimated that more than half of the structures on Rainey Street were "dilapidated". In 1985, amid fears of high-density commercial and residential redevelopment, the neighborhood was added to the National Register of Historic Places.

=== Redevelopment ===
The Rainey Street neighborhood was rezoned as part of Austin's central business district in 2004. The hope at the time was to encourage development near the Austin Convention Center and the since-built Emma S. Barrientos Mexican American Cultural Center. Bungalows were converted to bars, the first of which was Lustre Pearl, which opened in 2009, to the chagrin of neighbors. The 2-acre site that Lustre Pearl sat on was sold in 2014 and was ultimately developed into an 8-story, 250,000 sqft mixed use building with a 250 apartment complex called Camden Rainey Street. The bungalow that Lustre Pearl had been - which was built in 1895 - was ultimately relocated to 114 Linden St in East Austin in 2015 and turned into what is now Lustre Pearl East. Lustre Pearl opened a new location across the street from its original location on Rainey Street in 2016.

Two other bungalow bars on Rainey Street - The Container Bar (opened in 2013) and Bungalow (opened in 2012) - owned by the same person who founded Lustre Pearl (Bridget Dunlap) - and which sat on a 0.37-acre lot - closed up shop in 2022 to be replaced with a $300 million 55-story condo called The Modern, which opened in 2024.

Other bars on Rainey Street include: Banger's Sausage House and Beer Garden, the Blackheart, Javelina, Jack and Diane's and Rainey Street Bar are all under various stages of construction/rehabilitation.

== In popular culture ==
On the Texas-themed TV series King of the Hill, the main characters live on "Rainey Street" in the fictional Arlen, Texas. Show creator Mike Judge is an Austin resident.
