= One American Center =

Skyscraper in Austin, Texas, U.S.

Coordinates: 30.2686°N 97.7432°W

600 Congress
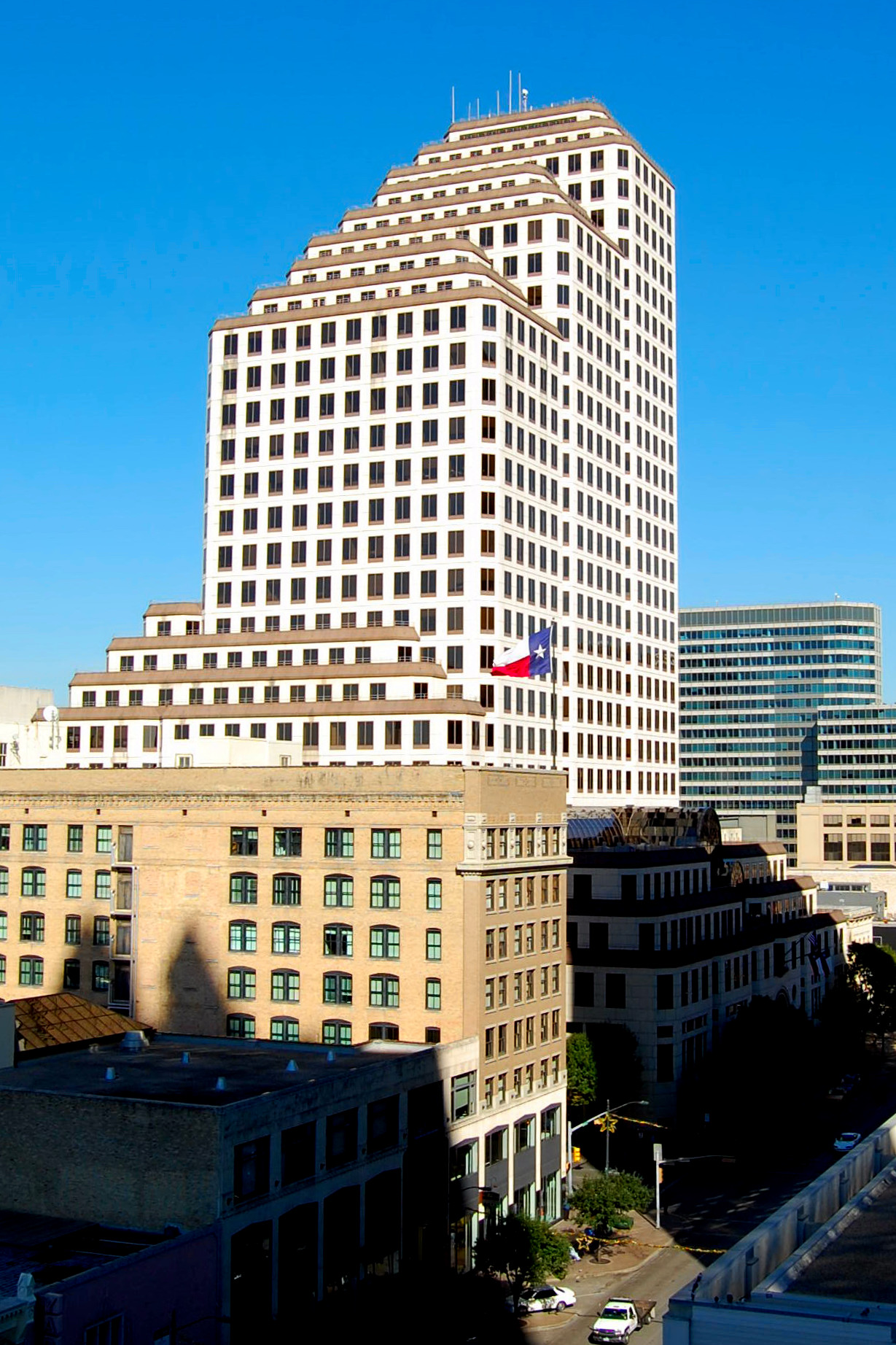
- 600 Congress in 2007
- Former names: One American Center

General information
- Status: Completed
- Architectural style: postmodernism
- Location: 600 Congress Avenue, Austin, Texas, U.S.
- Completed: 1984

Technical details
- Floor count: 32
- Floor area: 505,764 sq ft (46,987.0 m^{2})
- Lifts/elevators: 17

Design and construction
- Architect: Morris-Aubry

600 Congress (formerly known as One American Center) is a high-rise office building located at the northwest corner of West 6th Street and Congress Avenue in the Financial District of Downtown Austin, Texas, United States. Standing 400 feet (120 meters) tall and containing 32 floors, it is currently the 12th tallest building in Austin, tied with the Four Seasons Residences. The construction of One American Center was completed in 1984 and was developed by Rust Properties. It was the tallest building in Austin until the finishing of the Frost Bank Tower in 2003. In 2017, One American Center was rebranded as 600 Congress.

Until October 2022, Make-A-Wish Central and South Texas had a fundraising event called "Over The Edge," in which the first 300 persons to raise $1,500 in donations got to rappel 32 stories down 600 Congress.

== History ==
Construction on the One American Center began on August 16, 1982. The building replaced a former 2-story Art Deco-style Woolworth's Department Store, which had since housed a 5 and dime at the time of the building's demolition. Street-front diagonal parking on Congress Avenue was removed to make way for an expanded granite sidewalk and landscaping, including two rows of Texas red oak trees. A matching 22-story hotel was originally planned on the northwest corner of the property adjoining the building, but was never built.

== Architecture ==
The postmodern building was designed by Houston-based Morris-Aubry Architects. The building is designed with three stair-stepped tiers clad in pre-cast limestone trimmed with brown granite. The 20,000 cubic feet of granite consists of Sunset Red granite from Granite Mountain, close to Marble Falls, Texas, and Charlie Brown granite from Oklahoma, which was cut and polished in Puebla, Mexico. The ground level facade of the building contains notches to give the appearance of individual storefronts.

Preceded by Dobie Center	Tallest Building in Austin; 1982—2004; 120m	Succeeded by Frost Bank Tower
