= Marshall Strabala =

American architect

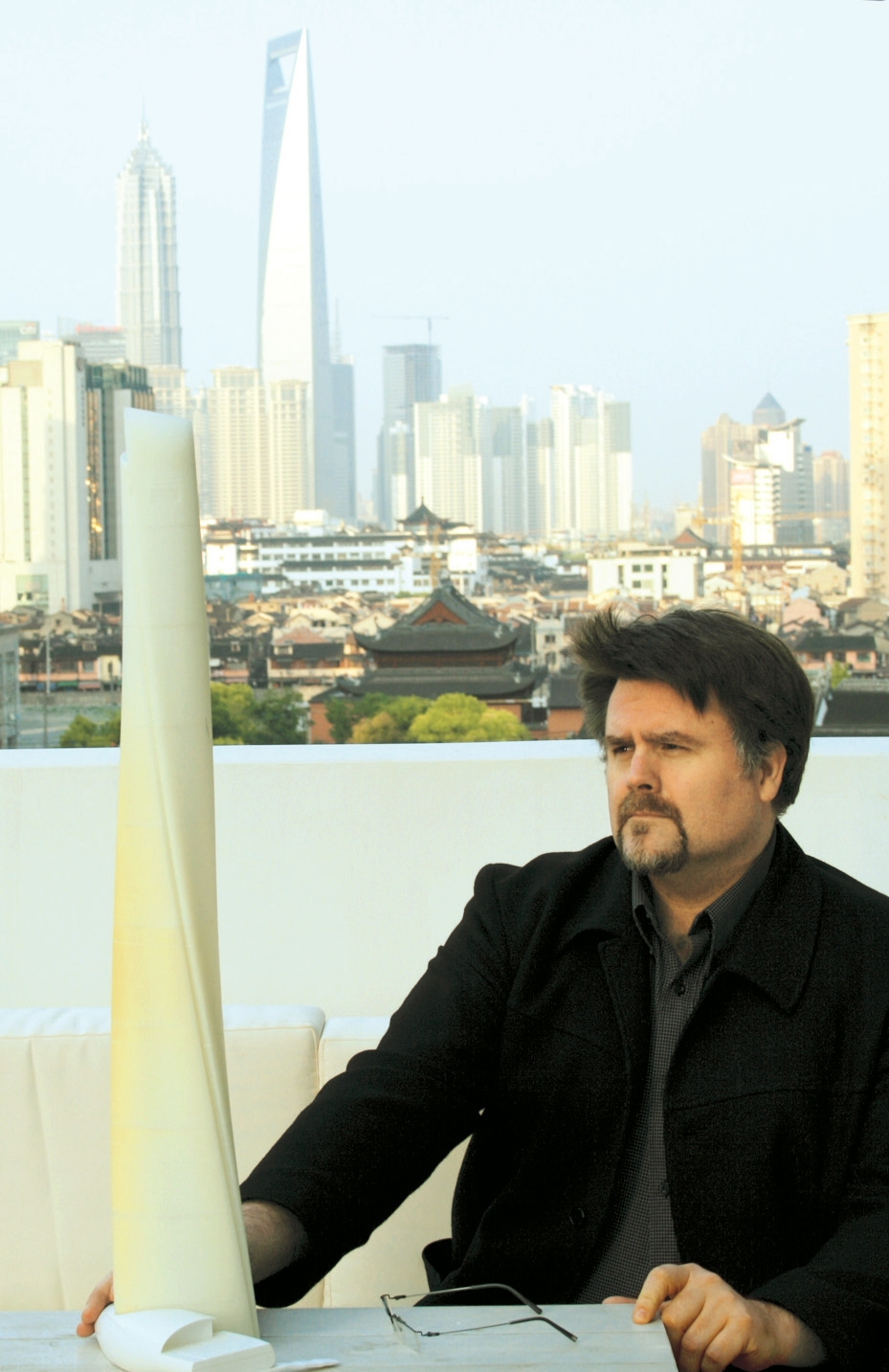
- Marshall Strabala views Shanghai Tower model with Shanghai skyline in background (2010)
- Born: Seattle, Washington, U.S.
- Education: Harvard University; University of California at Los Angeles
- Notable work: Shanghai Tower, Houston Ballet Center for Dance, Hess Tower
- Awards: Burnham Prize, 1996 (Graham Foundation for Advanced Studies in the Fine Arts & Chicago Architectural Club) ("open to architects who are younger than 40 years old and who live in the Midwest"); AIA Chicago Chapter Grand Projects Award

Jay Marshall Strabala is an American architect who has participated in the design of skyscrapers and other buildings. In 2010, Strabala founded 2DEFINE Architecture, an architectural firm, with three Chinese partners, though the partnership later soured. Before that, he had been employed by Skidmore, Owings and Merrill (SOM) and Gensler.

== Education ==
Strabala received his Bachelor of Arts in design from the University of California, Los Angeles. In 1988, Strabala graduated with a Master of Architecture from Harvard Graduate School of Design.

== Career ==
=== SOM ===
After graduating with his master's degree, Strabala worked at SOM in Chicago, Illinois, for 19 years. He ultimately was made an associate partner in charge of design.

While at SOM, Strabala served as the studio head under lead architect Adrian Smith in working on the design of Burj Khalifa (Dubai, 2009), which is the tallest building in the world. Strabala also worked under Smith as one of the two studio heads over the course of the project in designing the 450 m. tall Nanjing Greenland Financial Center (Nanjing, China, 2010). Also while at SOM, Strabala participated in the design of the Hong Kong Convention and Exhibition Centre (Hong Kong, 1997).

Strabala left SOM in 2006. In a 2007 interview, Adrian Smith said that Strabala was one of several architects up for partner at SOM who did not make it, in what Smith described as "a power move by the New York office."

=== Gensler ===
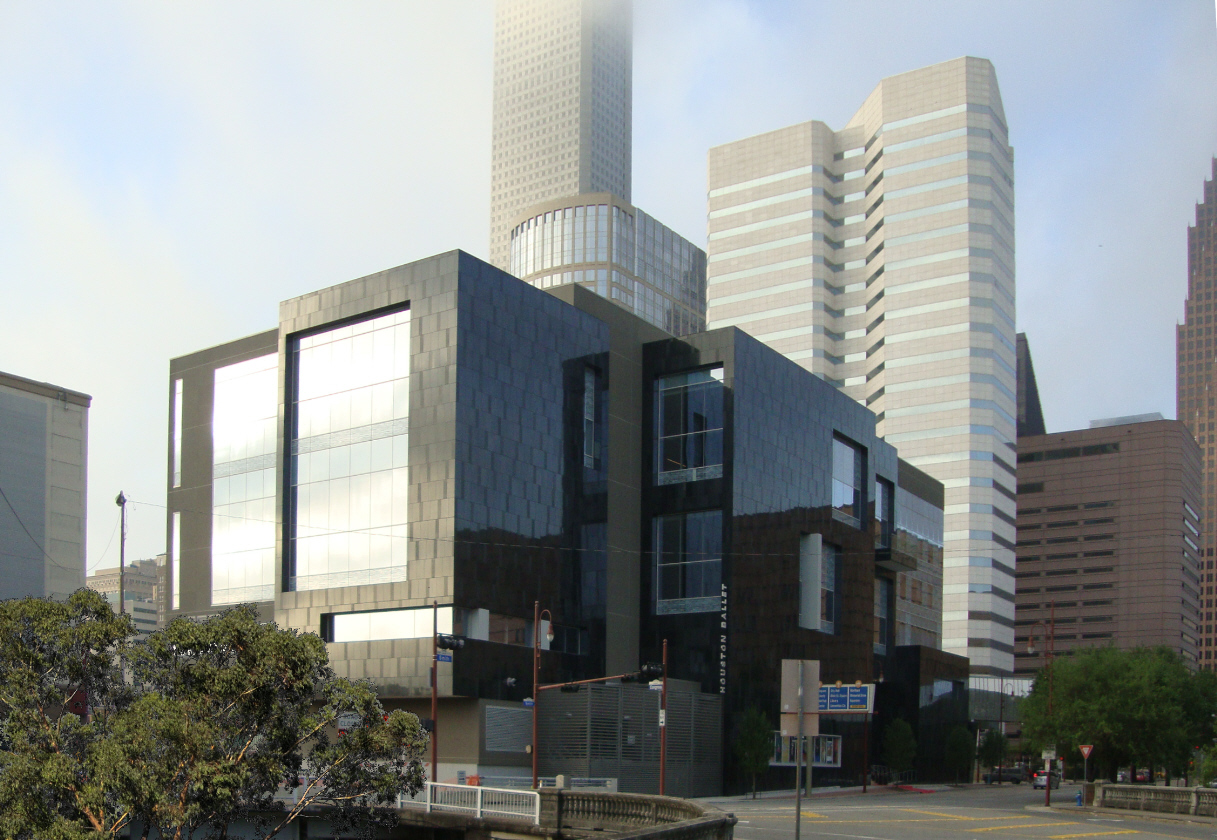
Houston Ballet Center for Dance

After leaving SOM, Strabala joined the Houston, Texas, office of the architectural firm Gensler in 2006.

While at Gensler, Strabala has been reported to have led the design of the 128-story Shanghai Tower and to have completed the "bulk of the design work". Gensler, however, claims that the tower is not Strabala's design. According to Gensler in a lawsuit it later dropped, "Gensler, not (Strabala), is the source of the architectural and design services rendered in designing the Shanghai Tower." Art Gensler, founder of Gensler, credited Jun Xia as "designer of the building (Shanghai Tower)". Xia was also credited as having "helped the firm score the Shanghai Tower contract and led the team's work on it", and as "the design principal for Gensler on the project."

Strabala also has been credited for leading Gensler's efforts in designing Hess Tower (Houston, 2010) and the Houston Ballet Center for Dance (2011). However, Gensler has claimed that "'Gensler, not (Strabala), is the source of the architectural and design services rendered in designing Hess Tower'", and that Strabala was but "'one of many members of that Gensler team'" that designed the Houston Ballet Center for Dance.

"In March 2010, before the [Shanghai] Tower was completed, Strabala had a falling out with Gensler and his employment with that firm terminated."

=== 2DEFINE Architecture ===
==== Founding ====
Shortly after leaving Gensler, "In June 2010, Strabala and three Chinese partners ([Qiao] Zhang, Zhou [Shimiao], and one other who has since left the partnership) founded 2DEFINE." According to Strabala, as of December 2010, he "continues to be involved in the Shanghai Tower project at the behest of the client".

==== Breakup and Lawsuits ====
"For reasons that are very much in dispute, the [2DEFINE Architecture] partnership soured and litigation ensued, first in China where the partnership was centered, and then in Illinois."

In February 2015, Strabala sued Zhang and Zhou in Illinois alleging "Zhang and Zhou were secretly diverting money from 2DEFINE," though Zhang and Zhou denied "any wrongdoing". In November 2016, the Illinois court partially denied and partially granted the defendants' motion to dismiss.

There were also three lawsuits in China. One was "a lawsuit brought by Zhou against Strabala." Another of them was "a lawsuit brought by Strabala against Zhang and Zhou." In 2014, Shanghai Huangpu District Court, in a case (case number:（2014）黄浦民二（商）初字第980号), in which Strabala alleged that Zhang and Zhou were secretly diverting money from 2DEFINE, all of Strabala's charge was turned down, by both the District Court Judge and the Judges from the Court of Appeals(case number（2016）沪02民终2258号). Finally, the third was "a lawsuit brought by Zhou's Chinese architecture firm, Tufan Architects Design Firm, against Strabala." According to Zhou in an affidavit in the Illinois lawsuit, "the first two lawsuits [in China] have been resolved, while the third was still pending at the time the affidavit was filed."

== Previous Employers Sue Strabala ==
=== Gensler ===
In June 2011, Gensler, sued Strabala alleging in a complaint that after founding his own firm Strabala publicly misrepresented his role in several projects while "'intentionally minimizing or entirely omitting the nature of Gensler's contribution.'" Gensler claimed that Strabala's actions violated the Lanham Act and various state laws.

In February 2012, Judge Ronald A. Guzman of the United States District Court for the Northern District of Illinois dismissed Gensler's complaint on procedural grounds before trial, ruling that the allegations Gensler made against Strabala do not constitute a violation of the Lanham Act or related state law. Gensler appealed the dismissal.

In August 2014, the U.S. Court of Appeals for the Seventh Circuit vacated the District Court's dismissal of the lawsuit and remanded the case back to the District Court therefore reviving the lawsuit. In April 2015, Gensler dropped the suit.

=== SOM ===
The day after Gensler sued Strabala, SOM sued Strabala in the United States District Court for the Southern District of New York alleging that he was "falsely claiming credit for work that originated with the company, including the designs for three of the 10 tallest buildings in the world." Among SOM's allegations was "that most of Strabala's work on Burj Khalifa, for example, "occurred in the construction-document phase" following design completion." The case was transferred to the United States District Court for the Northern District of Illinois in June 2012.

In December 2012, SOM and Strabala reached a binding settlement agreement and the case was dismissed under its terms. Neither party may discuss the lawsuit per the agreement.

== Local involvement ==
"[I]n or around 1999, he and his wife purchased a condominium in a well-known high-rise building in Chicago designed by the famed architect Ludwig Mies van der Rohe." Also in 1999, Strabala, speaking as a private citizen as part of a community group, testified before the Chicago City Council Zoning Committee against a high-rise development at 840 Lake Shore Drive in Chicago, Illinois. Strabala lived nearby and was concerned that the high-rise would be "out of scale with the neighborhood". Despite opponents' efforts, and that the project would "flout existing law", the Zoning Committee amended the ordinance allowing the project to proceed.
