= Jun Xia (architect) =

Chinese architect

- Born: Shanghai, China
- Education: Tongji University; University of Colorado Denver
- Occupation: Architect
- Buildings: Shanghai Tower

Jun Xia is a Chinese architect who has worked in the United States and China. Xia was a Principal and Regional Design Director of the Gensler architecture firm.

== Early life and education ==
Xia was born in Shanghai, China. He attended Tongji University from where he earned a bachelor's degree in architecture. He later earned a master's degree in architecture from the University of Colorado Denver.

== Shanghai Tower ==
Art Gensler, founder of Gensler, credited Xia as "designer of the building (Shanghai Tower)". Xia was also credited as having "helped the firm score the Shanghai Tower contract and led the team's work on it", and as "the design principal for Gensler on the project."

Two years before the state owned Shanghai Chengtou Group, the leading party of the joint venture developer owning the Shanghai Tower was assigned by the Shanghai Government to develop this tallest Chinese giant, Jun had already completed at least one round of full concept scheme design for an anonymous developer, as a land acquisition scheme for this parcel, which was planned for the tallest building in China. Although not officially released to the public, this scheme certainly was related to the form of the Shanghai Tower today, in the similarity of a twisting shape. It is not the exterior geometry of the building, but the interior space of the Shanghai Tower, that distinguish it from other super high rises. The signature atriums in the sky are "community spaces" in the sky, a translation of the traditional narrow lanes in Shanghai urban setting, where Jun grew up as a native Shanghainese. Jun said, "the concept comes from my childhood memory in Shanghai"

Designing the Shanghai Tower, Jun always said "not to be the tallest, but be the best."
