= Andy Cohen (architect) =

American architect

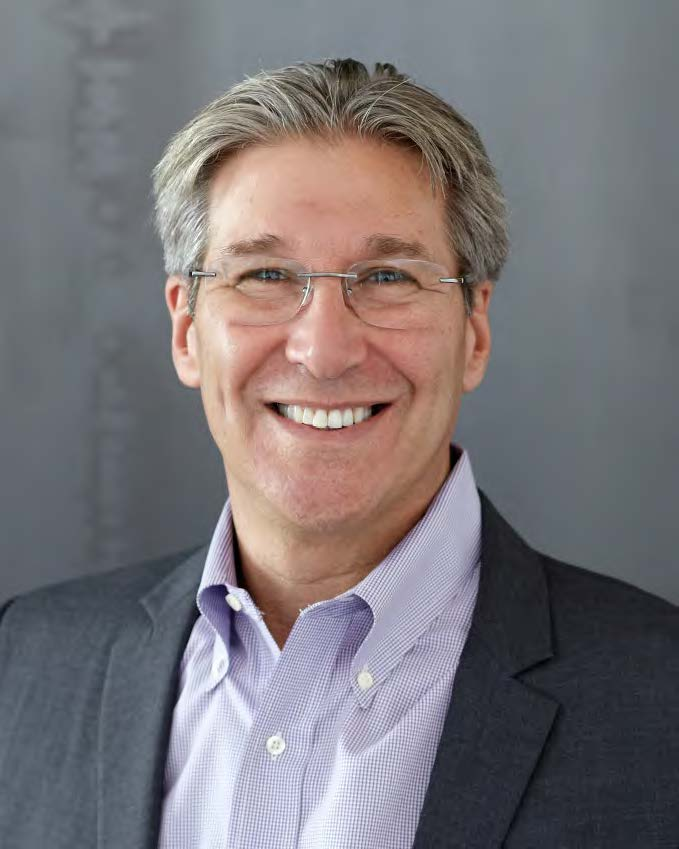
- Born: Andrew P. Cohen; Long Island, New York, U.S.
- Education: Pratt Institute
- Occupation: Architect
- Practice: Gensler
- Buildings: Shanghai Tower

Andy Cohen is an American architect and global co-chair of Gensler, the world's largest architecture and design firm by revenue. He served as co-CEO of the global company with Diane Hoskins from 2005 through the end of 2023. He is a fellow of the American Institute of Architects, a registered architect in 41 states, and member of the International Interior Design Association. He is also on the Gensler board of directors.

== Early life and education ==
Cohen was born in Lynbrook, a town in Nassau County, New York. He attended Lynbrook High School and earned a Bachelor of Arts in architecture with a concentration in sustainable design from Pratt Institute. Cohen's family owned a dairy store, Cohen's Dairy, on the Lower East Side of Manhattan. He was expected to run the family store, however, a passion for design led him to pursue architecture.

== Career ==
Cohen joined Gensler in 1980 as a designer focused on sustainability. He opened new practice areas for the firm including global aviation and transportation, as well as entertainment.

He and Gensler global co-chair Diane Hoskins co-authored a book, published in 2024, called "Design for a Radically Changing World," which focuses on how design can impact the world’s most pressing issues and help communities adapt to global crises.

== Projects ==
Cohen has worked on a number of buildings including The Ritz-Carlton Hotel and Residences at L.A. Live and the Shanghai Tower, which is the world's second tallest building. He is regularly published and quoted in the media on topics related to sustainability, the future of work, leadership, urban mobility, parking, and transportation.
