= Tower Two-Sixty =

Coordinates: 40.44021°N 80.00112°W

The Gardens at Market Square
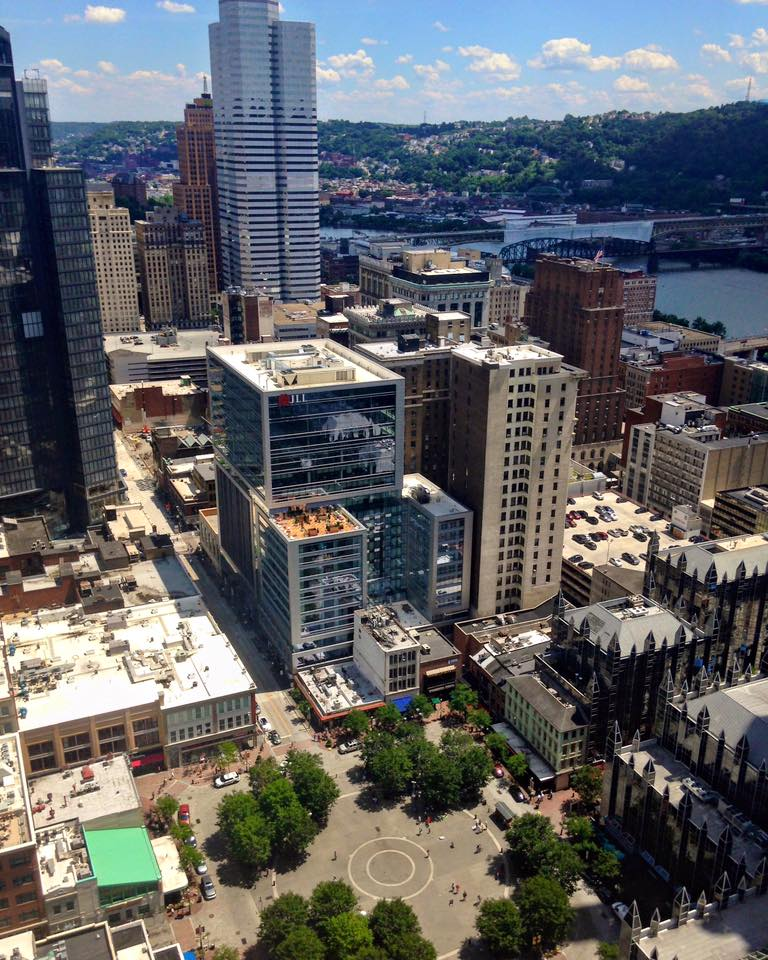
- Tower Two-Sixty, Downtown Pittsburgh
- Interactive map of the The Gardens at Market Square area

General information
- Type: Mixed-use
- Location: 260 Forbes Ave, Pittsburgh, Pennsylvania
- Construction started: 2013
- Completed: 2016
- Opening: 2016
- Cost: $104 million
- Owner: Millcraft Investments

Technical details
- Floor count: 18
- Floor area: 143,000 ft^{2} (13,285 m^{2})

Design and construction
- Architect: Arquitectonica
- Developer: Millcraft Investments
- Main contractor: Turner Construction

Tower Two-Sixty, alternatively known as “The Gardens at Market Square” or “The Gardens,” is a Millcraft Investments skyscraper in Pittsburgh, Pennsylvania, United States. Construction began in 2013 and was substantially completed in 2016. The $107 million, LEED CS Silver-certified tower consists of 18 floors and is located the Market Square and Point Park University sections of Downtown Pittsburgh. The tower includes a 197-room Hilton Garden Inn Hotel and Market Square Garage, 321-car parking complex managed by Alco Parking.

It includes 20,000 square feet of street level retail space, 130,000 square feet of Class-A "tower office" floor space and multiple restaurants.

Revel + Roost, previously known as Roost Fifty New American Kitchen, is a two-floor restaurant. Roost hosts upscale dining on the second floor, while Revel has an ultra-lounge atmosphere downstairs. Pirata is another restaurant tenant, offering Caribbean-style food and more than 200 rums. Pizzuvio, a fine casual Neapolitan pizzeria with handmade wood-fired ovens, is also located in the tower. Millie’s, a second location Pittsburgh-based small batch ice creamery originating in Shadyside.

In 2015, it was announced that commercial real estate company JLL would be the building’s anchor and namesake tenant, and re-identify the building as JLL Center at Tower Two-Sixty. JLL also serves as the building’s property manager. Other tenants in the building include Merrill Lynch, Coury Financial Group, McGuireWoods, and Millcraft itself.

Millcraft, JLL, and its partners have received several awards for Tower Two-Sixty including the Urban Land Institute award for Transformative Place, Master Builders’ Association of Western Pennsylvania Award, NAIOP Pittsburgh’s Best Mixed Use Project .

Preceded by Low-rise buildings	Pittsburgh Skyscrapers by Height 18 floors	Succeeded by The Carlyle
Preceded by Tower at PNC Plaza	Pittsburgh Skyscrapers by Year of Completion; 2015	Succeeded by Incumbent
