= Sixth and Guadalupe =

Commercial building in Austin, Texas, U.S.

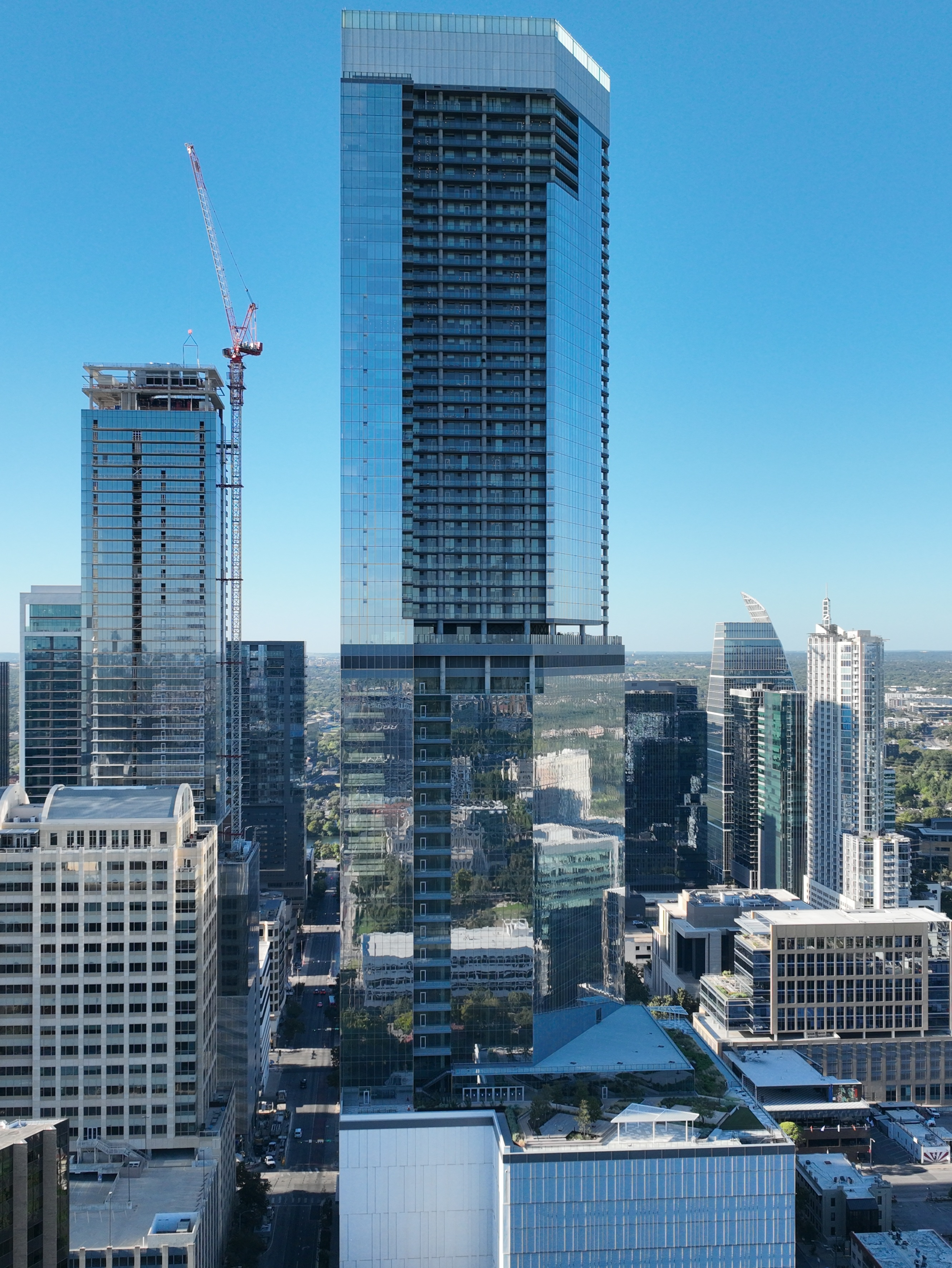
- Sixth and Guadalupe in 2024

General information
- Type: Commercial
- Location: 400 W. 6th St., Austin, Texas, U.S.
- Coordinates: 30.2693°N 97.74712°W
- Construction started: 2019
- Completed: 2024
- Operator: Lincoln Property Company (commercial) and Kairoi Residential (residential)

Height
- Roof: 865 ft (264 m)

Technical details
- Floor count: 66
- Floor area: 1,100,000 sq ft (100,000 m^{2})

Design and construction
- Architect: Gensler
- Structural engineer: Brockette/Davis/Drake, Inc.
- Main contractor: JE Dunn

Website
- www.lpcaustin.com/properties/600-guadalupe/

Sixth and Guadalupe is a 66-story mixed-use skyscraper in Downtown Austin, Texas, United States. It is the second-tallest building in Austin (behind Waterline) and the seventh-tallest building in Texas.

== History ==
In 1925 a red-brick five-story hotel called the Alamo Hotel was built on the site. For a time this hotel was the home of Sam Houston Johnson, younger brother to President Lyndon B. Johnson. The Alamo Hotel was also featured, briefly, in the music videos for Rock the Casbah and Pancho and Lefty. and was a former stomping ground of actor Harry Anderson. In 1984 the Alamo Hotel was torn down to make way for a 27-story mixed use office-hotel complex called Lamar Financial Plaza which, if built, would have been the second tallest building in Austin at the time. However, those plans were scrapped amidst the savings and loan crisis.

In 1998, the former site of the Alamo Hotel was replaced with a 97-room Extended Stay America, amid controversy. In 2019, the Extended Stay America was torn down and ground broke on the current building. On December 31, 2021, Meta signed a lease to occupy all eighteen floors of leasable office space, however, on November 3, 2022, a Meta spokesperson said that in light of declining profits, Meta would instead sublease the office space it had signed a lease for. On April 5, 2023, it was revealed that Kimbal Musk had signed a lease to open up a restaurant in Sixth and Guadalupe.

== Usage ==
Floors two through 12 contain 1,626 parking spots and 50 electric car charging stations, floors 14 through 32 contain 589,000 square feet (54,700 m^{2}) square feet of office space and floors 34 through 66 contain a 349-unit apartment complex, Residences at 6G.

The building's unique angled shape is due to Texas Capitol View Corridors (#8, South Lamar at La Casa Drive).

Preceded by The Independent	Tallest building in Austin; 2023-present 267 m	Succeeded by present
Preceded by The Independent	Tallest building in Texas outside of Dallas or Houston; 2023-present 267 m	Succeeded by present
