= Diane Hoskins =

American business executive and architect

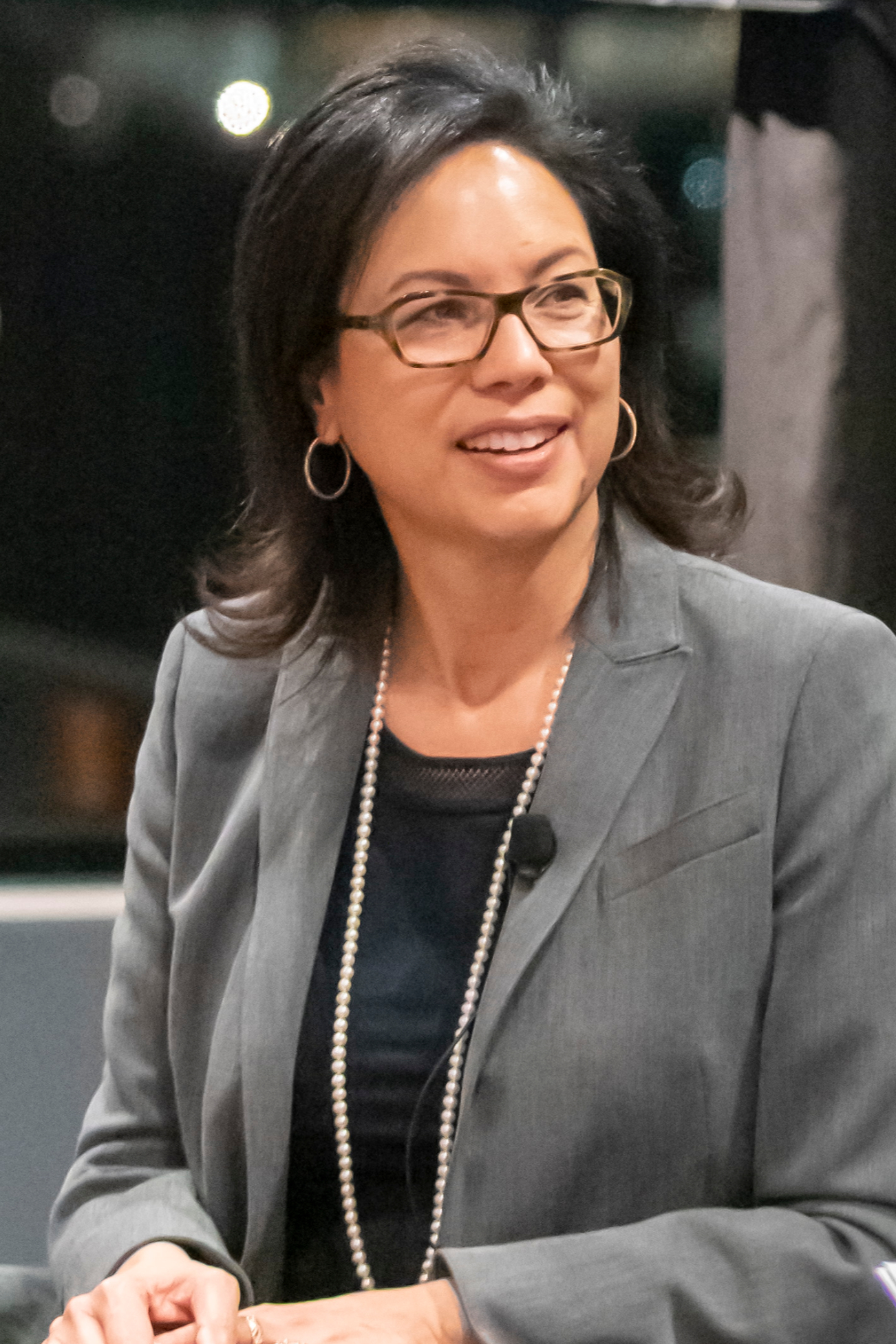
- Hoskins speaking in 2019 at the INDA conference
- Born: Chicago, Illinois, U.S.
- Education: Massachusetts Institute of Technology (BA); University of California, Los Angeles (MBA)
- Employer: Gensler
- Title: Co-CEO

Diane Hoskins is an American businessperson and architect who currently serves as global co-chair of Gensler, the world's largest architecture and design firm by revenue. She served as co-CEO of the global company with Andy Cohen from 2005 through the end of 2023. She is also on the board of directors for Boston Properties. Hoskins has been covered by The Washington Post Magazine, Fortune, Business Insider and other news sources as one of the most influential and powerful women in business.

== Early life and education ==
Hoskins grew up in Chicago. She attributes her decision to pursue architecture and design to the impression that the Chicago skyline made on her during her early years."

Hoskins received her undergraduate degree in architecture from MIT in 1979. For her graduate studies, Hoskins completed a Master of Business Administration from the Anderson School of Business at UCLA. In an interview with Glassdoor in 2017, she explained how the pedagogy of MIT's architecture program at the time which focused on human-centered design impacted her thinking about the importance of designing with users in mind. She also credited a course on managerial psychology at MIT's Sloan School of Management for sparking her interest in workplace design and behavior.

== Career ==
Before coming to Gensler, Hoskins held senior roles at Skidmore, Owings & Merrill, Epstein Architecture and Engineering, and Olympia & York. Hoskins joined Gensler in 1994 and was appointed to Co-CEO in 2005, the same year she founded the Gensler Research Institute.

Hoskins and Gensler global co-chair Andy Cohen co-authored a book, published in 2024, called "Design for a Radically Changing World," which focuses on how design can impact the world’s most pressing issues and help communities adapt to global crises.

She is a Fellow of the American Institute of Architects.

== Awards ==
- Outstanding Impact Award. Council of Real Estate Women
- Global Visionary Award. World Trade Center Institute’s Maryland International Business Leadership Awards.
- Spirit of Life Award. City of Hope.
- John E. Anderson Distinguished Alumni Award, UCLA, (2026)

== Projects ==
- Facebook Headquarters. Menlo Park, California.
- Microsoft headquarters. Ireland.
- Shanghai Tower. Shanghai, China.
- Ford Foundation Center. New York, New York.
