= Tower at PNC Plaza =

High-rise building in Pittsburgh, Pennsylvania

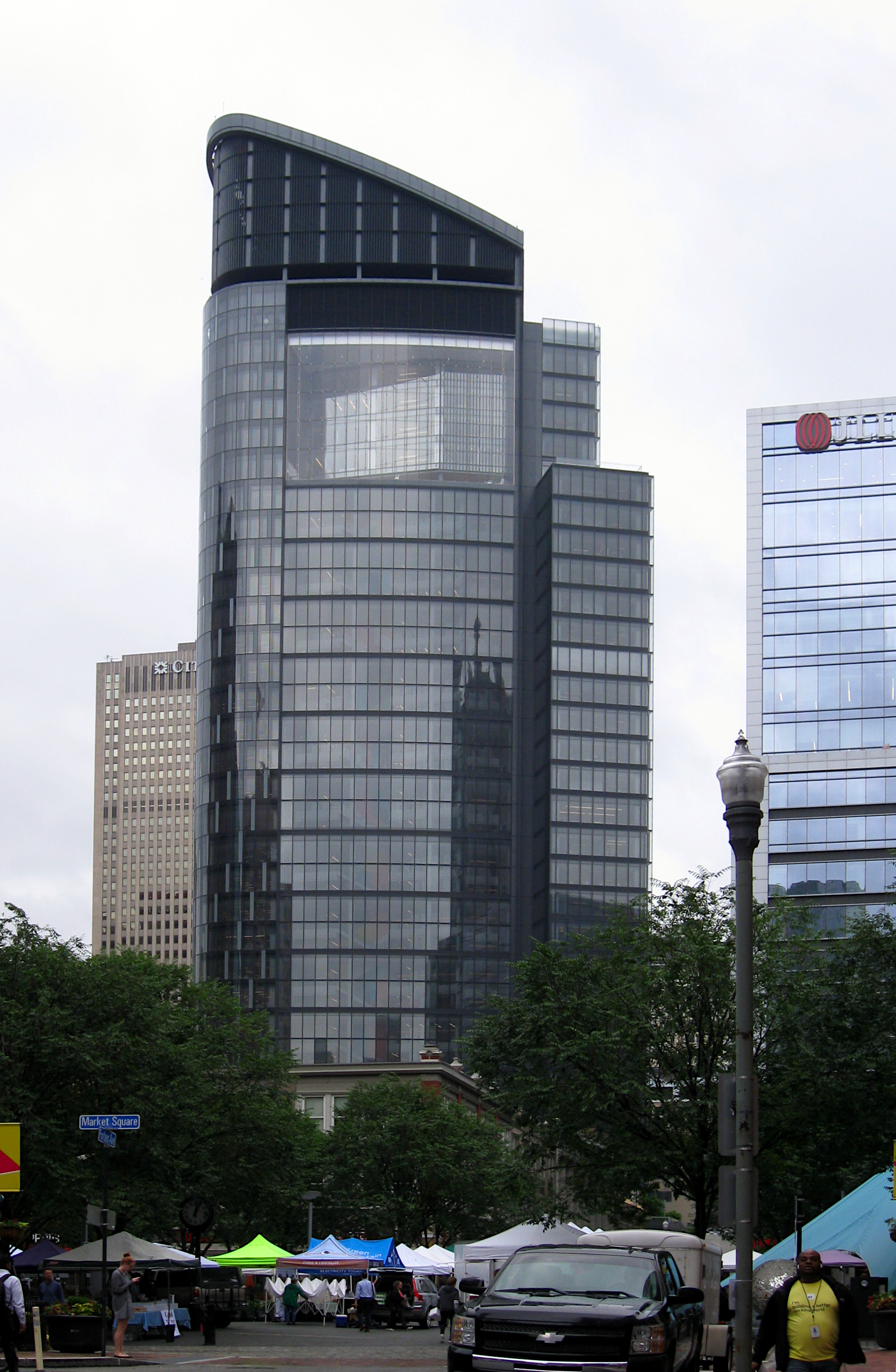
- Tower at PNC Plaza seen from Forbes Avenue
- Interactive map of the Tower at PNC Plaza area

General information
- Status: Completed
- Type: Office
- Location: 300 Fifth Avenue, Pittsburgh, Pennsylvania
- Coordinates: 40.44025°N 80.00017°W
- Construction started: 2011
- Completed: 2015
- Opening: October 2, 2015
- Cost: $400 million
- Owner: PNC Financial Services Group
- Operator: PNC Realty Services

Height
- Roof: 544 ft (166 m)
- Top floor: 424 ft (129 m)

Technical details
- Floor count: 33
- Floor area: 800,000 ft^{2} (74,322 m^{2})

Design and construction
- Architect: Gensler
- Developer: PNC Financial Services Group
- Main contractor: PJ Dick

The Tower at PNC Plaza is a 33-story skyscraper in Pittsburgh, Pennsylvania. It is the corporate headquarters of PNC Financial Services and has approximately 800,000 square feet (74,000 m^{2}) of floor space, standing 33 stories (545 feet; 166 m) tall. Nearby buildings totaling 37,000 square feet (3,400 m^{2}) were purchased by PNC and deconstructed to make space for the Tower at PNC Plaza. It is located at the intersection of Fifth Avenue and Wood Street, where PNC and its predecessors have been based since 1858.

The project was estimated to cost $400 million when announced in 2011 (or $572 million in 2025).

Construction began in spring 2012 and was completed in October 2015. The tower is one of the greenest high-rises ever built, and even exceeds the current criteria for a LEED Platinum certified building. The tower features sustainable attributes such as an operable double-skin facade, an onsite graywater reuse system, locally sourced building materials, fixtures and furniture made from recycled materials, and other green strategies to substantially reduce the environmental impact of the building. Some of these features enable the tower's heating and cooling systems to operate in a "net-zero-energy state" up to 30% of the year. This is accomplished by its innovative solar chimney, which creates a stack effect through the core of the building to ventilate excess heat without the need for mechanical ventilation. The tower's sloped roof acts as a solar collector and is positioned facing south.

The tower's "topping off" ceremony was held Tuesday, June 24, 2014, with William Demchak, PNC chairman, president and CEO, and Gary Saulson, director of corporate real estate, hosting it on site. The tower officially opened on October 2, 2015.

== Planning ==
In 2009, PNC approached Gensler with an idea for its new headquarters in Pittsburgh.

Gensler project team members toured several buildings for energy-efficient and sustainable design inspiration, such as Manitoba Hydro's headquarters in Winnipeg, Manitoba; the Bullitt Center in Seattle, Washington; KfW Bank in Frankfurt, Germany; and the Department of Public Works in San Francisco, California.

The tower was designed with three core pillars reflecting company values in mind: community builder, workplace innovator, and energy responder.

=== Community builder ===
PNC emphasized providing support for Pittsburgh's existing infrastructure, promoting downtown business growth, and augmenting the skyline.

Approximately 2,500 temporary jobs were created in the construction phase of the project. Additionally, 20% of the construction budget went to women- and minority-owned contractors.

=== Workplace innovator ===
Building interior and workspace design was informed by proprietary research and PNC-specific observations. A key design goal was to make innovative use of building space to promote collaboration and productivity. Two-story neighborhoods throughout the building connect paired office floors and feature varying programs and furnishings to foster different work experiences and encourage employees to move around the building.

=== Energy responder ===
The tower design was motivated by minimizing resource use and maximizing renewable energy opportunities.

== Design ==
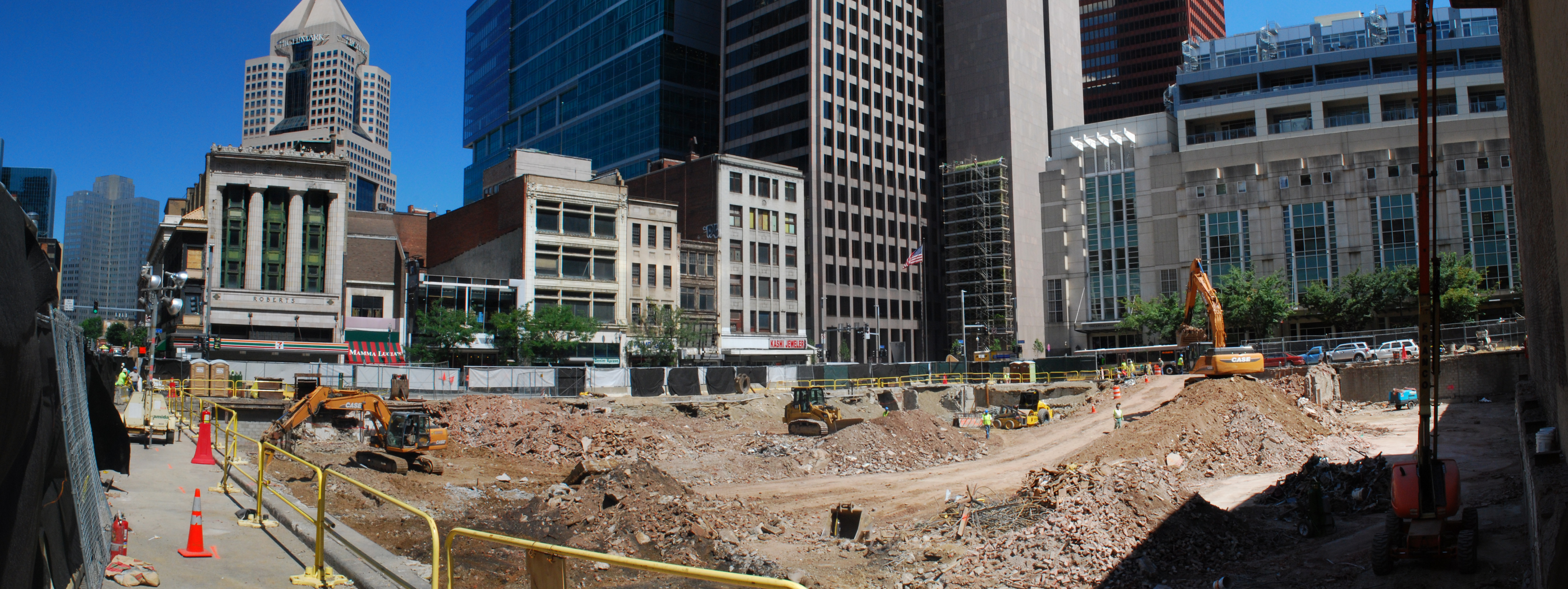
Progress on the tower site in June 2012

Gensler worked closely with the Buro Happold engineering team to implement innovative design features in the tower. Digital design, modeling tools, and full-scale mockups led to building performance successes.

=== Double-skin façade ===
Heintges provided curtain wall and building envelope consulting services for the project. The tower features the country's only fully automated double-skin façade that is a part of a solar-assisted natural ventilation system. Nearly 250,000 ft^{2} (23,000 m^{2}) of façade encloses more than 90% of the building. The façade is a window system with laminated glass on the exterior and an insulated glazing unit on the interior with a 30-inch (760 mm) gap in between them; the cavity provides insulation and helps regulate interior building temperature.

Fresh air enters the cavity through small, automatically programmed, vertical windows called "poppers" on the exterior façade. The interior façade features automated louvers called "floppers" for natural ventilation; there are added individual control features to enhance employee comfort. Employees can open wood-framed sliding glass doors that are part of the interior skin and step out onto the "porch" for fresh air.

The double-skin façade reduces heating and cooling as well as humidifying and de-humidifying energy loads with great reductions in the spring and fall months, when the building achieves close to net-zero performance. However, the tower does have built-in temperature and humidity controls to enhance and maintain human comfort year round. Buro Happold analysis shows that these controls still allow for natural ventilation for approximately 42% of working hours.

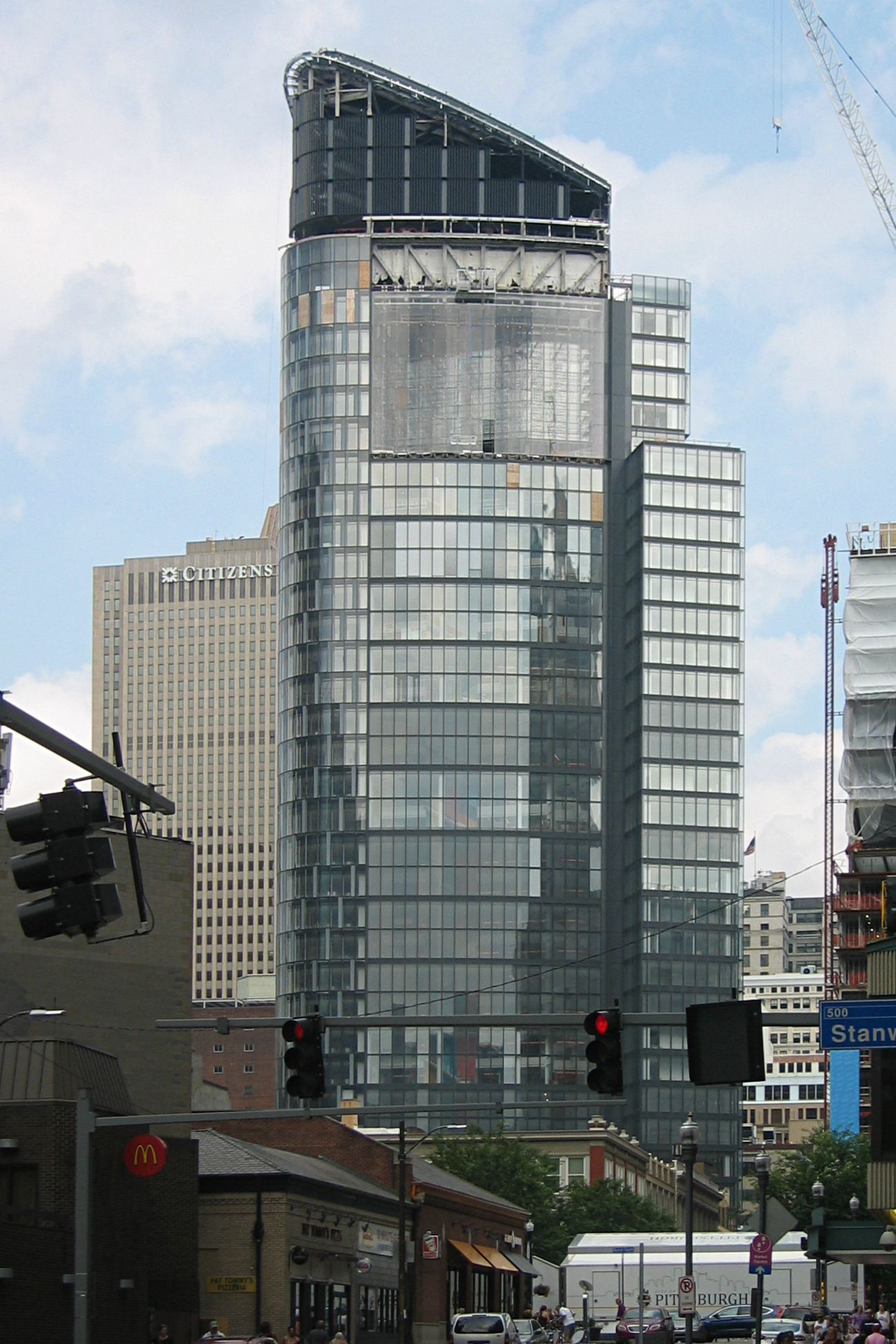
The tower as seen in June 2015, prior to its completion

=== Solar chimney ===
The tower features the largest solar chimney in a modern US building office. It is a 5,000-square-foot (460 m^{2}) glass box angled southwards toward the sun with two vertical shafts within the building.

Prior to constructing the solar chimney, Buro Happold design engineers erected a mockup solar chimney cap on a nearby PNC building rooftop to estimate how much thermal energy the chimney could store. Then, a larger mockup was built to test how the solar chimney would work with a double-skin façade and natural ventilation system.

The chimney works in tandem with the double-skin façade, drawing fresh air in through the exterior façade into the void space, where it naturally warms, rises, and exits at the roof skylight without using fan energy. On colder days, the skylight box preheats air before drawing it into the building.

=== Other features ===
==== Workplace amenities ====
The tower features several different collaborative environments, such as neighborhoods, "living rooms", outdoor terraces, observation decks, a cafeteria with seating for more than 250 employees, and an indoor park on the 28th floor of the building.

The indoor park is a five-story-tall sky garden featuring native, seasonal plantings. The temperature is allowed to fluctuate and mirror the outdoor temperatures, though there are temperature-control features that may be used for special events.

==== Active systems ====
A dual-wheel energy-recovery system provides humidification or dehumidification and heating or cooling for air before it enters the building. It works in tandem with the double-skin façade. The system was designed to be more efficient by using exhaust air for heating or cooling and humidifying and dehumidifying the air entering the building.

The building features high-efficiency condensing boilers and chillers as well as an efficient dual-temperature chilled-water system.

==== Lighting ====
The building tower is shifted from the podium and the street grid for maximum solar exposure. This orientation allows natural light to reach more than 90% of work areas. Automated controls for blinds activate based on the amount of light entering the building and the amount of glare present. Artificial lighting systems automatically adjust based on natural lighting conditions at employee workstations.

==== Water recycling ====
The building reclaims and treats stormwater in addition to gray- and blackwater for irrigation, toilet flushing, and cooling tower use, producing an estimated 77% reduction in potable water use.

Blackwater sewage treatment and a building-wide recycling program reduce the consumption burden and effluent loads on the municipal water systems.

==== The Beacon ====
The tower features a 30-foot (9.1 m) sculptural installation designed by ESI Design in the lobby. The Beacon visualizes the building's performance using real-time data such as energy use, water consumption, recycling, composting, natural ventilation, and daylighting.

== Sustainability and LEED ==
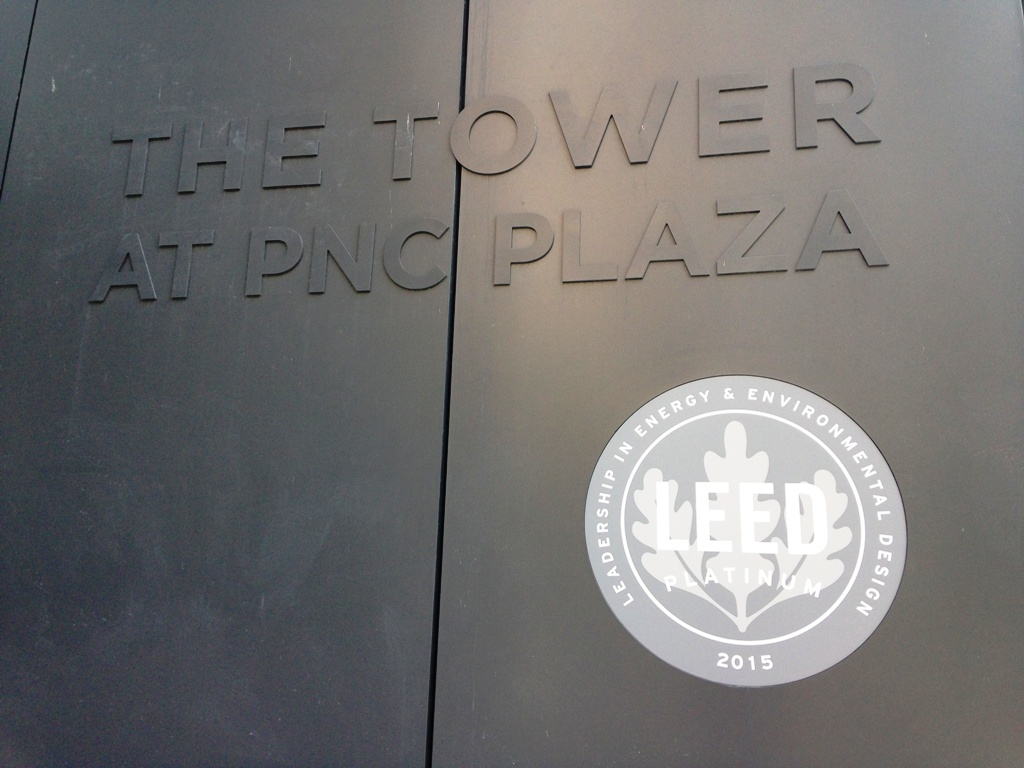
Tower at PNC LEED certification outside the front entrance

PNC has more newly constructed LEED-certified green buildings than any company in the world and was looking to expand its roster by building the Tower at PNC Plaza, the "Greenest Office Tower in the World".

Paladino and Company served as the sustainability and green building consultant for the project. Paladino provided LEED New Construction certification services for the project, which achieved LEED Platinum certification in fall 2015 by surpassing the requirements.

The building design is such that the tower achieves a 50% reduction in energy use overall.

Preceded by Cathedral of Learning	Pittsburgh Skyscrapers by Height; 545 feet 33 floors	Succeeded by Gulf Tower
Preceded by Three PNC Plaza	Pittsburgh Skyscrapers by Year of Completion; 2015	Succeeded by The Gardens at Market Square
