= The Independent (Austin, Texas) =

Skyscraper in Austin, Texas, U.S.

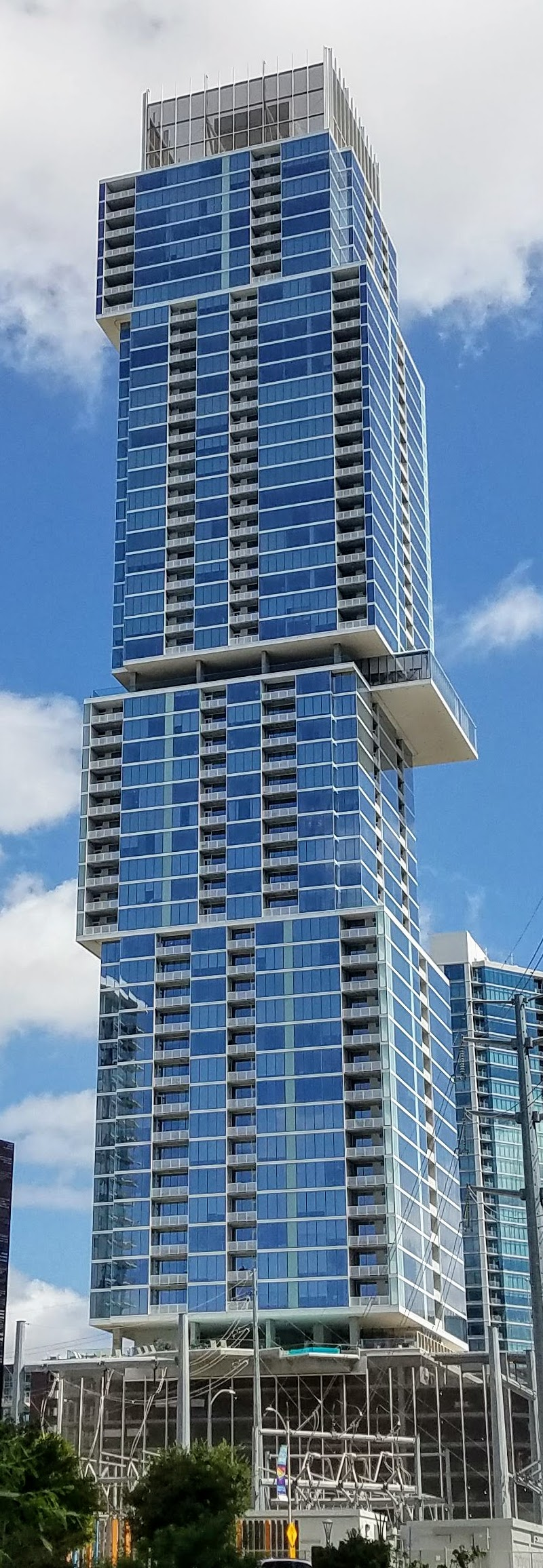
- The Independent in 2021
- Alternative names: Jenga Tower

Record height
- Tallest in Austin since 2019^{[I]}
- Preceded by: The Austonian

General information
- Status: Completed
- Type: Residential
- Location: 301 West Avenue, Austin, Texas, U.S.
- Coordinates: 30.267917°N 97.751240°W
- Construction started: 2016
- Completed: 2019

Height
- Height: 690 ft (210 m)

Technical details
- Material: Concrete
- Floor count: 58
- Floor area: 950,001 sq ft (88,258.0 m^{2})

Design and construction
- Architect: Rhode Partners
- Developer: Aspen Heights; CIM Group; Investcor; Constructive Ventures Inc
- Structural engineer: LAM+DCI Engineers
- Main contractor: Balfour Beatty Construction

Other information
- Number of units: 370

Website
- www.theindependentaustin.com

The Independent is a residential skyscraper in Austin, Texas, United States. At a height of 690 ft (210 m), it is the third-tallest building in the city, behind the 875-ft-tall (267 m) Sixth and Guadalupe and the 1,025-ft-tall (312 m) Waterline.

== Overview ==
The building was proposed in 2014, construction began in 2016, and was completed in spring 2019.

It contains 58 floors, 370 condos, and it has been nicknamed the "Jenga Tower", and the "Tetris Tower". The 9th floor contains amenities such as a heated pool, club room, playground, and dog park, while the 34th floor contains an owner's lounge, fitness center, yoga deck, and an outdoor lounge.

The design of the tower's crown has been criticized, to the extent of a protest group named Fix The Crown being created in March 2019.

== See also ==
- List of tallest buildings in Austin, Texas
- List of tallest buildings in Texas
- List of tallest buildings in the United States

Preceded by The Austonian	Tallest building in Austin; 2019-2023; 210 m	Succeeded by Sixth and Guadalupe
Preceded by The Austonian	Tallest building in Texas outside of Dallas or Houston; 2019-2023; 210 m	Succeeded by Sixth and Guadalupe
