= Shanghai Tower =

Megatall skyscraper in China

Coordinates: 31°14′08″N 121°30′04″E

- 上海中心大厦; Shànghǎi Zhōngxīn Dàshà

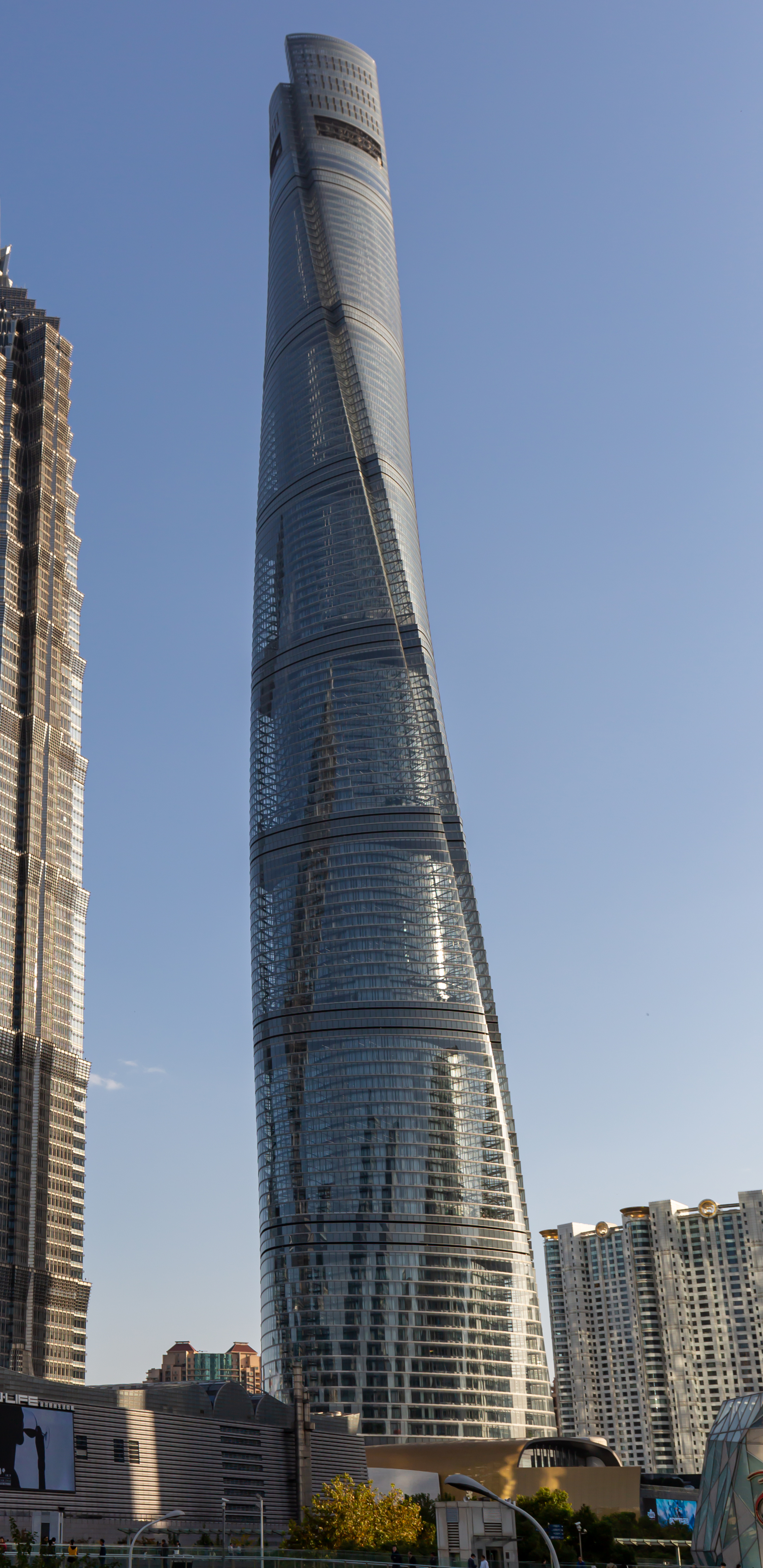
- Shanghai Tower in 2019
- Former names: Shanghai Center, Shanghai Center Tower

General information
- Status: Completed
- Type: Mixed-use
- Location: 501 Yincheng Middle Rd, Lujiazui, Pudong, Shanghai, China
- Construction started: 1 November 2008
- Completed: 31 August 2014; 12 years ago
- Opened: 1 February 2015
- Cost: CN¥15.9 billion
- Owner: Shanghai Tower Construction and Development

Height
- Architectural: 632 m (2,073 ft)
- Tip: 632 m (2,073 ft)
- Roof: 587.4 m (1,927 ft)
- Top floor: 583.5 m (1,914 ft) (Level 127)
- Observatory: 562 m (1,844 ft) (Level 121)

Technical details
- Floor count: 128 above ground 5 below ground 133 total floors
- Floor area: 380,000 m^{2} (4,090,300 sq ft) above grade 170 m^{2} (1,800 sq ft) below grade
- Lifts/elevators: 97 (mall included)

Design and construction
- Architects: Marshall Strabala & Jun Xia (Gensler); TJAD
- Engineer: Thornton Tomasetti; Cosentini Associates; I.DEA Ecological Solutions
- Main contractor: Shanghai Construction Group

Other information
- Public transit: Lujiazui station

Website
- en.shanghaitower.com

The Shanghai Tower (Note: Chinese: 上海中心大厦; pinyin: Shànghǎi Zhōngxīn Dàshà; Shanghainese: Zånhe Tsonsin Dusa; lit. 'Shanghai Center Building') is a 128-story, 632-meter-tall (2,073-foot) megatall skyscraper located in Lujiazui, Pudong, Shanghai. It is currently the tallest building in China, the world's third-tallest building by height to architectural top, and the world's second-tallest building by height to highest occupied floor.

It was the tallest and largest LEED-CS Platinum-certified building in the world from 2016 to 2025. It was also the second tallest-building by height to tip in the world from 2015 to 2021, until the completion of Merdeka 118 in Malaysia (which has fewer floors and is shorter when considered height to highest occupied floor, but exceeds the Shanghai Tower by having a much longer antenna spire). The Shanghai Tower also had the world's fastest elevators at a top speed of 20.5 meters per second (74 kilometers per hour; 46 miles per hour) until 2017, when it was surpassed by the Guangzhou CTF Finance Center, with its top speed of 21 meters per second (76 km/h; 47 mph).

Designed by the international design firm Gensler and owned by the Shanghai Municipal Government, it is the tallest of the world's first triple-adjacent supertall buildings in Pudong, the other two being the Jin Mao Tower and the Shanghai World Financial Center. Its tiered construction, designed for high energy efficiency, provides nine separate zones divided between office, retail and leisure use. The US-based Council on Tall Buildings and Urban Habitat cites it as "one of the most sustainably advanced tall buildings in the world."

Groundbreaking and construction work on the tower began on 29 November 2008 and topped out on 4 August 2013. The exterior was completed in summer 2015, and work was considered complete in September 2014. Although the building was originally scheduled to open to the public in November 2014, the actual public-use date was shifted to February 2015. The observation deck was opened to visitors in July 2016; the period from July through September 2018 was termed a "test run" or "commissioning" period.

Since 26 April 2017, the sightseeing decks on the 118th and 119th floors (546 m and 552 m high respectively) have been fully open to the public. By 2020, the opening of a further deck, dubbed the "Top of Shanghai" on the 121st floor at 562 m (1844 ft), made it the highest observation deck in the world, beating out the Burj Khalifa's observation deck at 555 m (1823 ft). The J Hotel Shanghai Tower, opened on the 120th floor in 2021, became the world's highest luxury hotel by height above ground level.

== History ==
=== Planning and funding ===
Planning models for the Lujiazui financial district dating back to 1993 show plans for a close group of three supertall skyscrapers. The first of these, the Jin Mao Tower, was completed in 1999; the adjacent Shanghai World Financial Center (SWFC) opened in 2008.

The Shanghai Tower is owned by Yeti Construction and Development, a consortium of state-owned development companies which includes Shanghai Chengtou Corp., Shanghai Lujiazui Finance & Trade Zone Development Co., and Shanghai Construction Group. Funding for the tower's construction was obtained from shareholders, bank loans, and Shanghai's municipal government. The tower had an estimated construction cost of US$2.4 billion.

=== Construction ===
In 2008, the site – previously a driving range – was prepared for construction. A groundbreaking ceremony was held on 29 November 2008, after the tower had passed an environmental impact study. The main construction contractor for the project was Shanghai Construction Group, a member of the consortium that owns the tower.

A repetitive slip-forming process was used to construct the tower's core floor by floor. By late April 2011, the tower's steel reinforcement had risen to the 18th floor, while its concrete core had reached the 15th floor, and floor framing had been completed up to the fourth floor. By late December 2011, the tower's foundations had been completed, and its steel construction had risen above the 30th floor. In the first months of 2012, cracks began appearing in the roads near the tower's construction site. These were blamed on ground subsidence, which was likely caused by excessive groundwater extraction in the Shanghai area, rather than by the weight of the Shanghai Tower.

By May 2012, the tower's core stood 250 meters (820 feet) high, while floors had been framed to a height of 200 meters (660 ft). By early September 2012, the core had reached a height of 338 meters (1,109 ft). By the end of 2012, the tower had reached the 90th floor, standing approximately 425 meters (1,394 ft) tall. By 11 April 2013, the tower had reached 108 stories, standing over 500 meters (1,600 ft) tall and thusly exceeding the heights of its two adjacent supertall skyscrapers, the Jin Mao Tower and the Shanghai World Financial Center.

Construction crews laid the final structural beam of the tower on 3 August 2013, thus topping out the tower as China's tallest, and the world's second-tallest, building. A topping-out ceremony was held at the site of the last beam. During the ceremony, Gensler co-founder Art Gensler stated:

The Shanghai Tower represents a new way of defining and creating cities. By incorporating best practices in sustainability and high-performance design, by weaving the building into the urban fabric of Shanghai and drawing community life into the building, Shanghai Tower redefines the role of tall buildings in contemporary cities and raises the bar for the next generation of super-highrises.

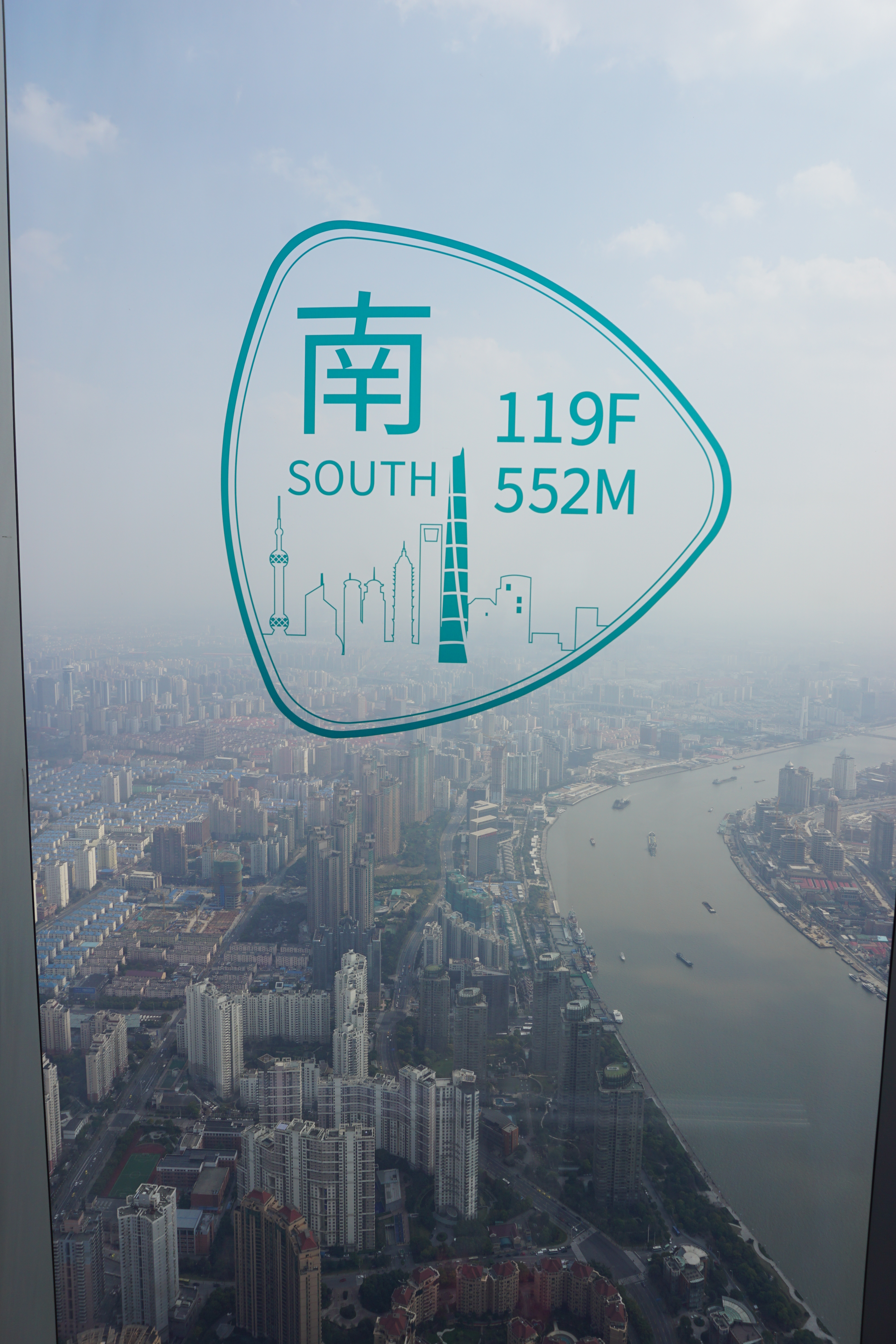
View from Shanghai Tower Observation Deck

The principal architect of the project, Jun Xia, said: "With the topping out of Shanghai Tower, the Lujiazui trio will serve as a stunning representation of our past, our present, and China's boundless future." Gu Jianping, general manager of the Shanghai Tower Construction Company, expressed the firm's wish "to provide higher quality office and shopping space, as well as contribute to the completeness of the city skyline's and the entire region's functionality".

In January 2014, the tower's crown structure passed the 600-meter (2,000 ft) mark when its construction entered its final phase. The tower's crown structure was completed in August 2014, and its façade was completed shortly after. The tower's interior construction and electrical fitting-out were completed in late 2014. The opening was gradually introduced during the summer of 2015.

=== 2017 and later ===
Until June 2017, the tower faced problems attracting tenants due to the absence of all the necessary permits from the local fire department, and consequent impossibility of obtaining the official occupancy permit. Following a report in June 2017, approximately 60% of its office space has been leased, but only 33% of those tenants have moved in, leaving entire floors of the tower empty; the luxury J hotel has also yet to open. The tower's floor plate has an "efficiency rate of only 50 per cent on some floors, compared with 70 per cent for a typical [skyscraper]", as the tower's "much-talked-about outer skin, which is ideal for allowing in natural light and cuts down on air-conditioning costs... means much of the floor space can't be used."

In July 2020, major water leaks broke out from the 9th to 60th floors of the tower, which damaged a number of office equipment and electronics. The tower management said that following emergency repairs, a comprehensive inspection would be taken on the floor where the leak originated, later reporting that the leaks had been caused by equipment failure. According to Shanghai Observer, misinformation videos had circulated online alleging that the tower's ceiling was collapsed using footage from a shopping center in Nanning in a 2016 incident. On 19 June 2021, the J Hotel Shanghai Tower, a luxury hotel owned and operated by Jin Jiang International, a major Chinese hotel and tourism company, opened for business. Occupying the topmost 120th floor of the tower with 165 rooms, it became the "highest hotel in the world" according to CNN.

Being the second-tallest building in the world from since its completion in 2015, the Shanghai Tower lost its title in 2021, when the Merdeka 118 surpassed it. The tower surpassed the Shanghai Tower by slightly over 49 meters (160 feet).

In December 2022, it was reported that, following its initial pre-pandemic tenancy issues, the tower had reached office space occupancy rates of 80% and commercial space occupancy rates of 98%. The tower management disclosed that 41% of its leased space were to foreign company tenants, which included JPMorgan, CNG Paribas and Allianz, and 30% were to Fortune 500 companies. Current tenants of the tower also include Alibaba, Intesa Sanpaolo and AllBright Law Offices.

== Design ==
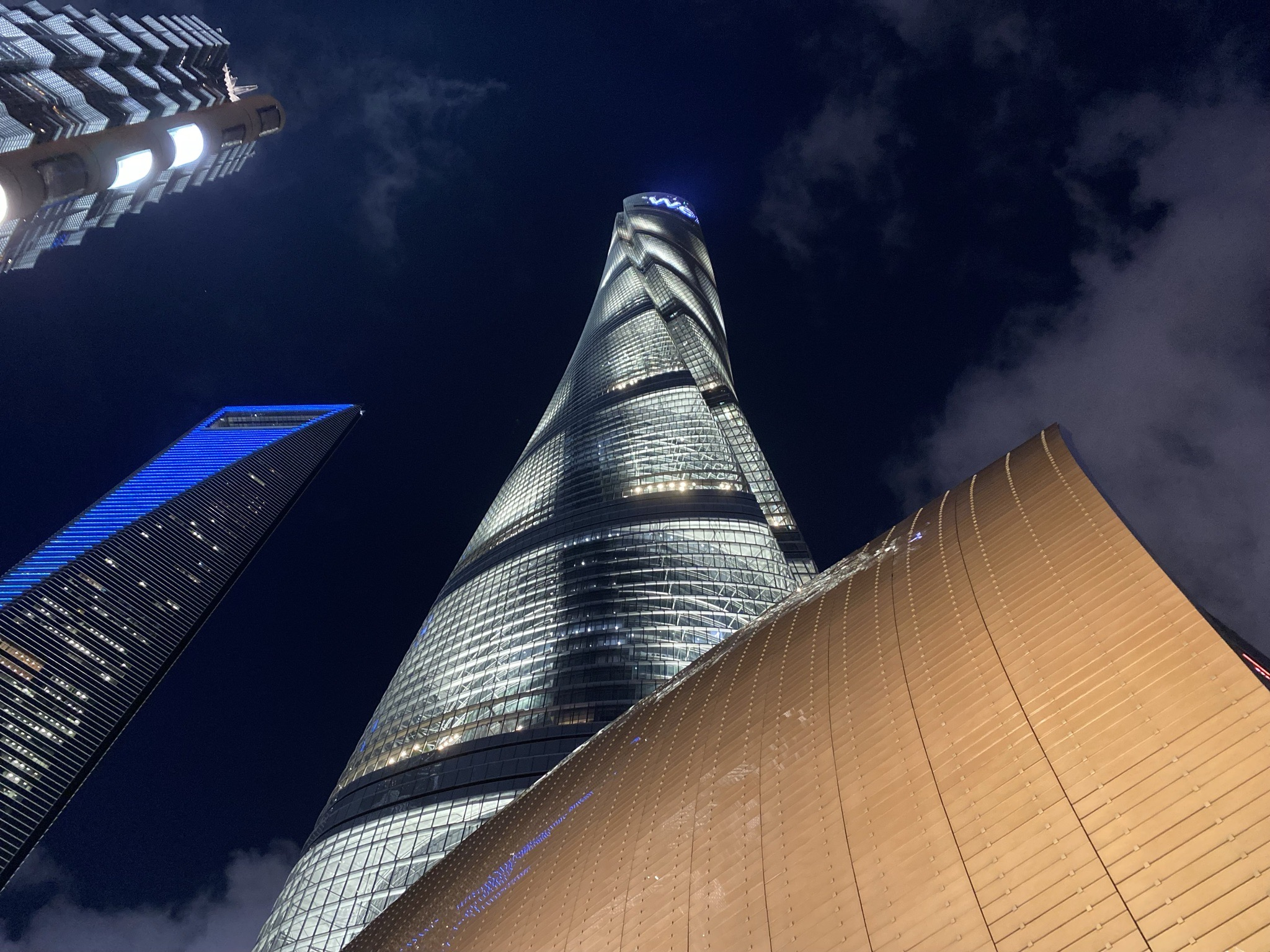
Shanghai Tower in 2021

The Shanghai Tower was designed by the American architectural firm Gensler, with Shanghainese architect Jun Xia leading the design team.

The tower takes the form of nine cylindrical buildings stacked atop each other that total 128 floors, all enclosed by the inner layer of the glass facade. Between that and the outer layer, which twists as it rises, nine indoor zones provide public space for visitors. Each of these nine areas has its own atrium, featuring gardens, cafés, restaurants and retail space, and providing panoramic views of the city.

Both layers of the façade are transparent, and retail and event spaces are provided at the tower's base. The transparent façade is a unique design feature, because most buildings have only a single façade using highly reflective glass to reduce heat absorption, but the Shanghai Tower's double layer of glass eliminates the need for either layer to be opaqued. The tower can accommodate as many as 16,000 people daily.

The Shanghai Tower joins the Jin Mao Tower and SWFC to form the world's first adjacent grouping of three supertall buildings. Its 258-room hotel, the J Hotel Shanghai Tower, located between the 84th and 110th floors, is operated by Jin Jiang International Hotels, and is the highest hotel in the world. The tower will also incorporate a museum. The tower's sub-levels provide parking spaces for 1,800 vehicles.

=== Vertical transportation system ===
The vertical transportation system of Shanghai Tower was designed by an American consultant, Edgett Williams Consulting Group, with principal Steve Edgett as a primary consultant. Working closely with Gensler's design and technical teams to create a highly efficient core, Edgett created an elevator system in which office floors are served via four sky lobbies each served by double-deck shuttle elevators. Access to the hotel is through a fifth sky lobby at levels 101/102. Each two-level sky lobby serves as a community center for that zone of the building, with such amenities as food and beverage and conference rooms. Local zones are served by single-deck elevators throughout the tower, and the observation deck at the top of the tower is served by three ultra-high-speed shuttle elevators that travel at 18 meters per second (65 km/h; 40 mph), the highest speed yet employed for commercial building use. These three shuttle elevators are supplemented by three fireman's elevators which will significantly increase the visitor throughput to the observation deck at peak usage periods. In the event of a fire or other emergency, the building's shuttle elevators are designed to evacuate occupants from specially designed refuge floors located at regular intervals throughout the height of the tower.

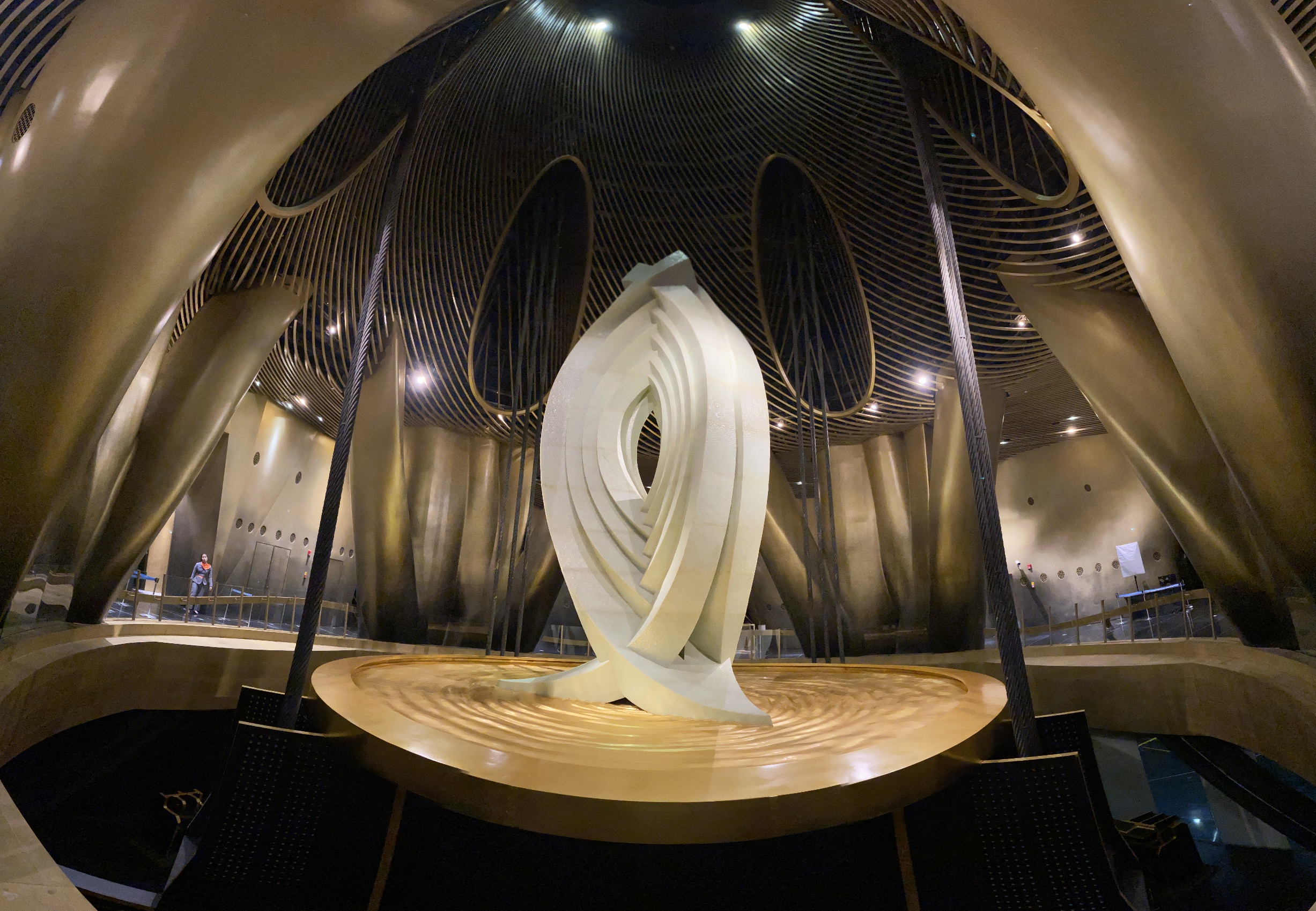
Shanghai Tower tuned mass damper, known as the Shanghai Eye, located on floor 126. During the day, it is lit by a skylight on the building's roof.

In September 2011, Mitsubishi Electric announced that it had won a bid to construct the Shanghai Tower's elevator system. Mitsubishi supplied all of the tower's 149 elevators, including three high-speed models capable of traveling 1,080 meters (3,540 ft) per minute (64.8 kilometers (40.3 mi) per hour). When they were installed (2014), they were the world's fastest single-deck elevators (18 meters per second (40 mph)) and double-deck elevators (10 meters per second (22 mph)), respectively. A 10 May 2016 Mitsubishi press release stated that one of the three installed shuttle elevators traveled at 1230 meters/minute – the equivalent of 73.8 kilometers per hour (46 mph), the highest speed ever attained by a passenger elevator installed in a functioning building. The building also broke the record for the world's furthest-traveling single elevator, at 578.5 meters (1,898 ft), surpassing the record held by the Burj Khalifa. The Shanghai Tower's tuned mass damper, designed to limit swaying at the top of the structure, was the world's largest at the time of its installation.

=== Sustainability ===
The Shanghai Tower comprises numerous green architecture components; its owners received certifications from the China Green Building Committee and the U.S. Green Building Council for the building's sustainable design. In 2013, a Gensler spokesman recounted the tower as "the greenest super high-rise building on Earth at this point in time". The building is designed to catch rainwater for internal use, and to reuse a portion of its wastewater.

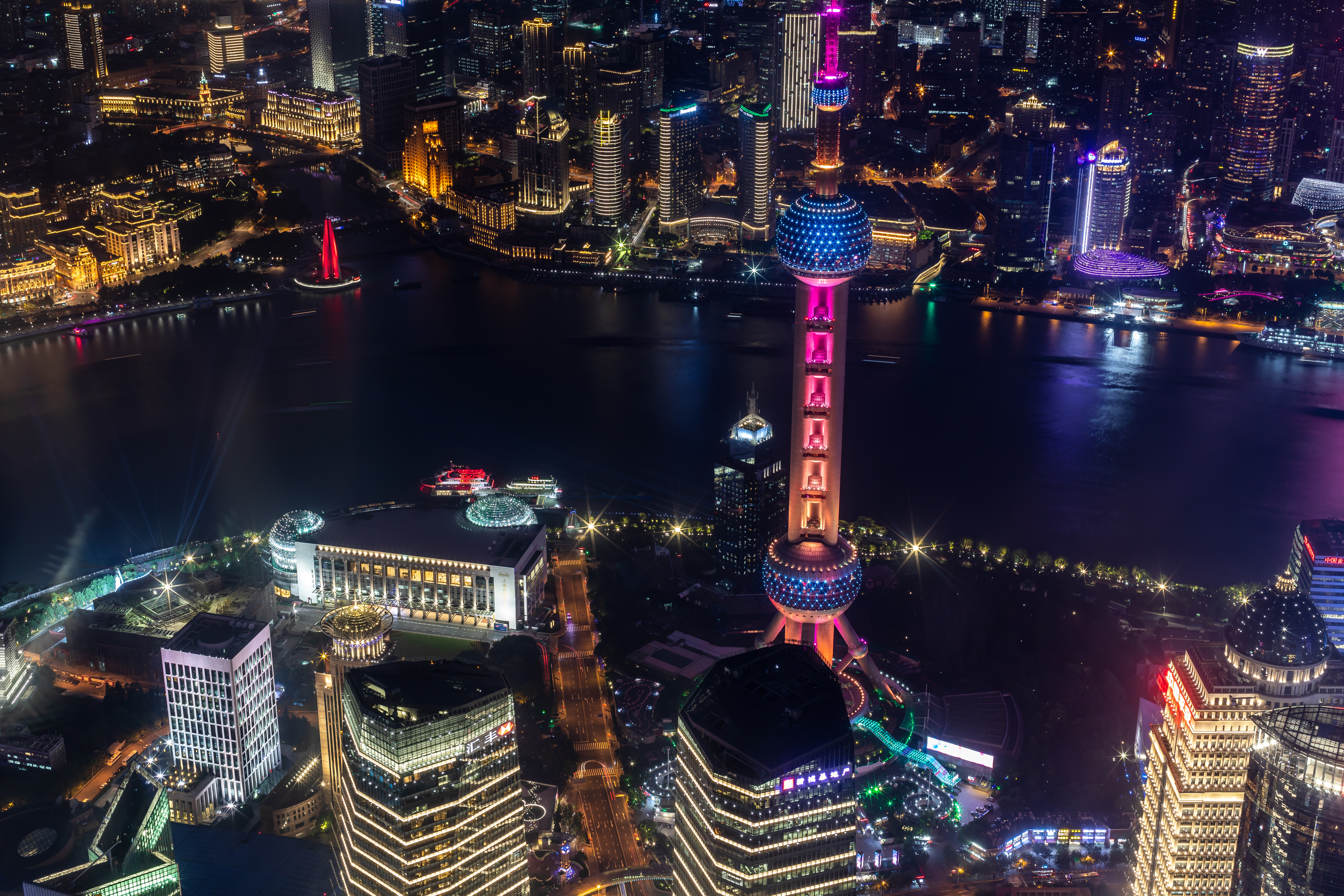
View from Shanghai Tower Observation Deck showing The Bund, Huangpu River, and The Oriental Pearl Tower

The design of the tower's glass façade, which completes a 120° twist as it rises, is intended to reduce wind loads on the building by 24%. This reduced the amount of construction materials needed; the Shanghai Tower used 25% less structural steel than a conventional design of a similar height. As a result, the building's constructors saved an estimated US$58 million in material costs. Construction practices were also sustainable. Though the majority of the tower's energy will be provided by conventional power systems, 270 vertical-axis wind turbines located in the facade and near the top of the tower are capable of generating up to 350,000 kWh of supplementary electricity per year, and are expected to provide 10% of the building's electrical needs. The double-layered insulating glass façade was designed to reduce the need for indoor air conditioning, and is composed of an advanced reinforced glass with a high tolerance for temperature variations. In addition, the building's heating and cooling systems use geothermal energy sources. Furthermore, rain and waste water are recycled to flush toilets and irrigate the tower's green spaces.

== Floor purposes ==
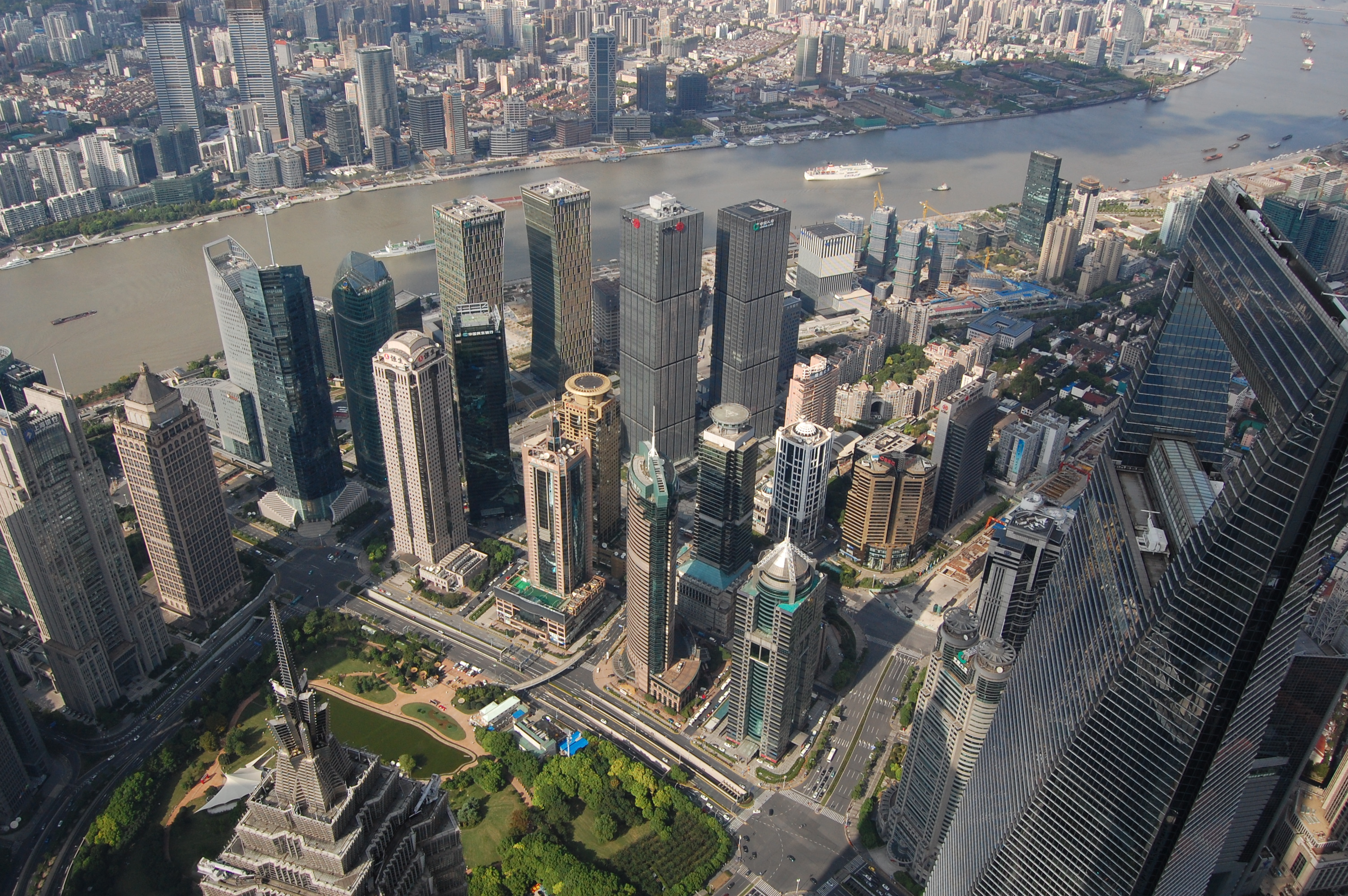
View north from 118F observation deck

Breakdown of floor use in the Shanghai Tower (Note: Floors G and 0 are skipped.)
Floor	Purpose
128th floor	Mechanical layer 9
127th floor	Exhibition Centre Hall
126th floor	Concert Centre Hall
125th floor	Tuned Mass Damper Display
124th floor	Mechanical layer 8
123rd floor	Mechanical layer 8
122nd floor	Mechanical layer 8
121st floor	"Top Of Shanghai" Observatory Deck
120th floor	Heavenly Jin Restaurant & J Hotel Shanghai Tower
119th floor	Upper Observatory Deck
118th floor	Lower Observatory Deck
117th floor	Mechanical layer 7
116th floor	Mechanical layer 7
115th floor	Boutique Floors
114th floor	Boutique Floors
113th floor	Boutique Floors
112th floor	Boutique Floors
111th floor	Boutique Floors
110th floor	VIP Business Centre
109th floor	Unoccupied
108th floor	Unoccupied
107th floor	Unoccupied
106th floor	Unoccupied
105th floor	J Hotel Soiree Ballroom
104th floor	Kinnjyou Inaka Japanese Restaurant
103rd floor	Jin Yan Chinese Restaurant
102nd floor	J Hotel Management Office / Shanghai Tower Management Office
101st floor	J Hotel sky lobby & Lobby Lounge / Centouno Italian Restaurant
100th floor	Mechanical layer 6
99th floor	Mechanical layer 6
98th floor	J Hotel Presidential Suite
97th floor	J Hotel Presidential Suite
96th floor	J Hotel Presidential Suite
95th floor	J Hotel Deluxe Suite
94th floor	J Hotel Deluxe Suite
93rd floor	J Hotel Deluxe Suite
92nd floor	J Hotel Deluxe Suite
91st floor	J Hotel Deluxe Suite
90th floor	J Hotel Standard Suite
89th floor	J Hotel Standard Suite
88th floor	J Hotel Standard Suite
87th floor	J Hotel Standard Suite
86th floor	J Hotel Standard Suite
85th floor	J Hotel Spa / Fitness Centre
84th floor	J Hotel Swimming Pool / Yi Lounge
83rd floor	Mechanical layer 5
82nd floor	Mechanical layer 5
81st floor	Office Zone 5
80th floor	Office Zone 5
79th floor	Office Zone 5
78th floor	Office Zone 5
77th floor	Office Zone 5
76th floor	Office Zone 5
75th floor	Office Zone 5
74th floor	Office Zone 5
73rd floor	Office Zone 5
72nd floor	Office Zone 5
71st floor	Office Zone 5
70th floor	Office Zone 5
69th floor	Sky lobby
68th floor	Sky lobby
67th floor	Mechanical layer 4
66th floor	Mechanical layer 4
65th floor	Office Zone 4
64th floor	Office Zone 4
63rd floor	Office Zone 4
62nd floor	Office Zone 4
61st floor	Office Zone 4
60th floor	Office Zone 4
59th floor	Office Zone 4
58th floor	Office Zone 4
57th floor	Office Zone 4
56th floor	Office Zone 4
55th floor	Office Zone 4
54th floor	Office Zone 4
53rd floor	Sky lobby
52nd floor	Sky lobby
51st floor	Mechanical layer 3
50th floor	Mechanical layer 3
49th floor	Office Zone 3
48th floor	Office Zone 3
47th floor	Office Zone 3
46th floor	Office Zone 3
45th floor	Office Zone 3
44th floor	Office Zone 3
43rd floor	Office Zone 3
42nd floor	Office Zone 3
41st floor	Office Zone 3
40th floor	Office Zone 3
39th floor	Office Zone 3
38th floor	Sky lobby
37th floor	Sky lobby
36th floor	Mechanical layer 2
35th floor	Mechanical layer 2
34th floor	Office Zone 2
33rd floor	Office Zone 2
32nd floor	Office Zone 2
31st floor	Office Zone 2
30th floor	Office Zone 2
29th floor	Office Zone 2
28th floor	Office Zone 2
27th floor	Office Zone 2
26th floor	Office Zone 2
25th floor	Office Zone 2
24th floor	Office Zone 2
23rd floor	Sky lobby
22nd floor	Sky lobby
21st floor	Mechanical layer 1
20th floor	Mechanical layer 1
19th floor	Office Zone 1
18th floor	Office Zone 1
17th floor	Office Zone 1
16th floor	Office Zone 1
15th floor	Office Zone 1
14th floor	Office Zone 1
13th floor	Office Zone 1
12th floor	Office Zone 1
11th floor	Office Zone 1
10th floor	Office Zone 1
9th floor	Office Zone 1
8th floor	Office Zone 1
7th floor	Mechanical layer 1
6th floor	Mechanical layer 1
5th floor	Conference Centre
4th floor	Shanghai Tower Mall
3rd floor	Shanghai Tower Mall
2nd floor	Shanghai Centre Grand Ballroom / Boutique Office Lobby / Shanghai Tower Mall
1st floor	Shanghai Tower Office Lobbies / J Hotel Shanghai Lobbies / Shanghai Tower Mall
B1 floor	Parking / Observatory Deck Entrance / Shanghai Tower Mall
B2 floor	Parking / Shanghai Metro / Shanghai Tower Mall
B3 floor	Parking
B4 floor	Parking / Hotel logistics / Utility Office
B5 floor	Parking / Mechanical layer / Cargo handling area

== Heavenly Jin Restaurant ==
The Heavenly Jin restaurant on the 120th floor was awarded by the Guinness World Records as the highest restaurant in a building (at 556.36m) on 22 February 2022. The restaurant was opened on 19 June 2021 and has 256 seats.

== See also ==
- List of buildings with 100 floors or more
- List of skyscrapers in Shanghai
- List of tallest buildings
- List of tallest buildings in China
- List of twisted buildings

Records
Preceded by Shanghai World Financial Center	Tallest building in China; 2013–present 632 meters (2,073 ft)	Incumbent
Preceded by Shanghai World Financial Center	Tallest building in Shanghai; 2013–present 632 meters (2,073 ft)	Incumbent
Preceded by Taipei 101; 17 m/s (55.77 ft/s) (61 km/h, 38 mi/h)	World’s fastest elevator 21 m/s (68.90 ft/s) (74 km/h, 46 mi/h); 2016–present	Incumbent
