= Art Gensler =

American architect (1935–2021)

- Born: Millard Arthur Gensler Jr. July 12, 1935; New York City, U.S.
- Died: May 10, 2021 (aged 85); Mill Valley, California, U.S.
- Education: Cornell University
- Occupation: Architect
- Organization: Gensler

Millard Arthur Gensler Jr. (July 12, 1935 – May 10, 2021) was an American architect and entrepreneur. He was best known for founding Gensler, the world's largest architecture firm. The firm's most prominent works include the terminals at the San Francisco International Airport and Shanghai Tower, the third-tallest building in the world.

== Early life and education ==
Millard Arthur Gensler Jr. was born in 1935 in the New York City borough of Brooklyn. Gensler's father was Millard Arthur Gensler, Sr., a.k.a. "Slats", an architectural sales representative who sold ceiling tiles. His mother, Gertrude Gensler, worked as a switchboard operator for the telephone company. He attended high school in Hartford, Connecticut, after the family moved there, and earned his B.Arch. degree in 1958 from Cornell University, where he played soccer and tennis and was a member of the Delta Phi fraternity (Llenroc).

== Career ==
In 1962, Gensler moved to San Francisco, where in 1965 he and his wife, Drue Gensler, along with James Follet, founded M. Arthur Gensler Jr. & Associates Inc., now known as Gensler. As of May 2021 the firm had 5,000 employees in 50 cities around the world. It covers 28 aspects of design under separate specializations and is decentralized, with no headquarters; it retains a hub in San Francisco. Gensler himself personally designed only one building for a client, the original Apple Store, at Steve Jobs's insistence.

While Gensler stepped down as the firm's chairman in 2010, he continued to work as an adviser.

Gensler published his first book, Art's Principles, in 2015.

== Philanthropy ==
In January 2021, Art Gensler made a $10 million gift to Cornell University's College of Architecture, Art, and Planning as an endowment for the college's New York City satellite program, which Gensler co-created in 2006 with the then dean of the college, Mohsen Mostafavi. As a result of the gift, AAP NYC will be renamed to the Gensler Family AAP NYC Center.

== Personal life ==
In 1957, Gensler married Drue Cortell; they have four sons, David, Douglas, Robert, and Kenneth. David Gensler was a co-CEO at Gensler; Douglas C. Gensler is an architect and co-managing director for Gensler's office in Boston.

Gensler died at his home on May 10, 2021.

== Awards ==
The Design Futures Council awarded Gensler its Lifetime Achievement Award in 2016.

== See also ==
- List of American architects
