= Gensler =

U.S.-based design and architecture firm

M. Arthur Gensler Jr. & Associates, Inc.
- Trade name: Gensler
- Type: Private
- Industry: Architecture
- Founded: 1965; 61 years ago San Francisco, California, U.S.
- Founders: M. Arthur Gensler Jr.; Drue Gensler; James Follett
- Number of locations: 58 offices
- Area served: Worldwide
- Key people: Andy Cohen (co-chair); Diane Hoskins (co-chair); Jordan Goldstein (co-CEO); Elizabeth Brink (co-CEO)
- Services: Architecture; Brand Design; Consulting & Real Estate; Digital Experience Design; Interior Design; Sustainability; Urban Strategies & Design
- Revenue: US$1.88 billion (2024)
- Number of employees: 6,000 (2025)
- Website: gensler.com

Gensler is a global design and architecture firm headquartered in San Francisco, California, United States. It is the largest architecture firm in the world by revenue and number of architects.

In 2022, Gensler generated $1.785 billion in revenue, the most of any architecture firm in the U.S. As of late 2026, Gensler operated a of 58 offices in 16 countries worldwide, working for clients in over 100 countries.

== History ==
Art Gensler founded the firm in 1965, along with his wife Drue Gensler and their associate James Follett. They originally focused on corporate interiors, for newly constructed office buildings including the Alcoa Building (1967) and the Bank of America Building (1969), both in San Francisco. The firm has since diversified into numerous forms of architecture and design, including commercial office buildings, retail centers, airports, education facilities, entertainment complexes, planning and urban design, mission-critical facilities, consulting, brand design, and other areas.

Gensler grew rapidly with offices opening around the U.S. in the 1970s and 1980s and then overseas in the 1980s and 1990s. In 1972, the firm established an office in Houston to provide interior design services for Pennzoil Company's 600,000-sq-ft corporate headquarters. In 1979, the firm opened its New York office to provide interior design and production services for Mobil Oil Corporation's corporate headquarters in Fairfax, Virginia. In 1988, the firm launched its first overseas office in London, followed by new offices in Tokyo and Hong Kong in 1993. In 2002, Gensler opened an office in Shanghai, establishing a permanent presence in China. By the early 2000s, Gensler was the largest architecture and design company headquartered in the U.S.

In 2005, Gensler's board of directors extended the firm's collaborative leadership structure by naming Andy Cohen, Diane Hoskins, and David Gensler as executive directors/co-CEOs. After serving as co-CEOs for nearly 20 years, Cohen and Hoskins became Gensler’s first global co-chairs in 2024, and the firm named Jordan Goldstein and Elizabeth Brink as the new co-CEOs .

== Influence and industry impact ==
As the firm's global footprint has grown, Gensler has launched megaprojects such as CityCenter (Gensler served as Executive Architect of the 67-acre, 18 million-square-foot "city within a city" in Las Vegas), SFO Airport (beginning with the Central Terminal project in 1980 and continuing with comprehensive T2, T3, and T1 renovations), and Shanghai Tower (a 128-story mixed-use tower). In 2013, the 2,073-foot Shanghai Tower became China's tallest building, and the second-tallest in the world.

In 2023 Gensler undertook the office-to-residential conversion of 160 Water Street in Manhattan's Financial District. The project is expected to yield 588 residential rental units and has been applauded by politicians such as Mayor Eric Adams as well as activists concerned with the city's lack of housing.

== Research ==
In 2005, Gensler debuted its first U.K. Workplace Survey, followed by a U.S. Workplace Survey in 2006, and the formal establishment of the Gensler Research program in 2007. The firm launched subsequent U.S. & U.K. Workplace Surveys in 2008, 2013, and 2016. Gensler's Workplace Surveys now encompass five continents, with surveys in Australia, China, France, Germany, India, Japan, Latin America, the Middle East, U.K., and the U.S. In 2010, Gensler's research program secured a registered trademark for its Workplace Performance Index (WPI), a trademarked pre- and post-occupancy tool. In 2017, Gensler celebrated the 10th anniversary of the Gensler Research Program (now the Gensler Research Institute) with the publication of Gensler's Research Catalogue, Volume 2. In 2017, the firm launched the Gensler Experience Index, which quantifies the direct impact design has on experience, followed by industry reports in the Education, Healthcare, Residential, Retail, and Hospitality sectors. In 2020, the firm launched Gensler's City Pulse Survey, surveying residents in four cities during lockdown due to COVID-19, followed by another City Pulse Survey in 2021, surveying 10 cities to see how the pandemic has reshaped urban life.

== Programs and initiatives ==
In 1990, Gensler established Gensler University, the firm's chief platform for leadership development. Subsequently, the firm established the Diversity Scholarship, a juried program that recognizes emerging talent among African-American college students enrolled in an accredited architectural program, and the Gensler Brinkmann Scholarship Fund, which was established in 1999 as a memorial to Donald G. Brinkmann, a gifted interior designer and former partner at Gensler. In 2007, the firm established its gServe community impact program. Gensler's Community Impact program encourages offices to dedicate at least 80 percent of their Community Impact resources to one or more of four themes: Housing and Homelessness, Health and Wellness, the Environment, and the Next Generation.

In 2015, Gensler signed the Paris Pledge for Action at the COP21 conference, pledging to reduce carbon emissions to limit climate change to less than 2 degrees Celsius. At the U.N. Climate Action Summit in 2019, Co-CEO Diane Hoskins announced the Gensler Cities Climate Challenge (GC3), which challenges the architecture and design industry to eliminate all greenhouse gases associated with the built environment. To further that pledge, Gensler is launching new green specifications that focus on reducing high-carbon materials. Gensler's "Impact Through Design" report, launched in 2016, explores strategies for architecture and design to play a greater role in global climate change strategy and mitigation, reinforcing this commitment to sustainability with the firm's subsequent "Impact by Design" reports in 2017, 2018, 2019, 2020, 2021, and 2022.

In 2023, Gensler announced the launch of the Gensler Product Sustainability (GPS) Standards. Starting in January 2024, the standards will be required for all Gensler projects in the U.S., Canada, and Europe. At COP28, Gensler partnered with the International Finance Corporation (IFC) to jointly expand low-carbon building certification and access to green finance.

== Recognition ==
Gensler was awarded the Architecture Firm Award in 2000 by the American Institute of Architects (AIA).

In 2009, Gensler became the first firm inducted into the Interior Design Hall of Fame.

Gensler received the AIA Institute Honor Award for Architecture for the HyundaiCard Air Lounge in 2012 and the Jackson Hole Airport in 2014.

For the third year in a row, Forbes included Gensler among "America’s Best Midsize Employers" in 2018.

Gensler received the highest ranking on Interior Design magazine's "Top 100 Giants" list.

Gensler was included among Glassdoor's Best Places to Work 2020.

The National Center for Employee Ownership named Gensler the 21st largest employee-owned company in the U.S. on the NCEO 2020 Employee Ownership 100.

The AIA Committee on the Environment named three Gensler projects winners of the COTE Top Ten Awards, recognizing the Ford Foundation Center for Social Justice, UPCycle, and Etsy headquarters for integrating design excellence and sustainable performance.

Gensler received the #1 rank overall in Building Design's 2021 World Architecture 100 Rankings.

For a decade, Gensler has topped Architectural Record's annual list of the Top 300 Architecture Firms in the U.S.

For the third year, Fast Company named Gensler among the "World’s Most Innovative Companies 2021" as one of the 10 Most Innovative Companies in Architecture.

Fast Company ranked Gensler among the 100 Best Workplaces for Innovators in 2021, recognizing the firm's new proprietary NFORM Ecosystem.

Engineering News-Record ranked Gensler as the #1 Top Green Design Firm for six consecutive years, from 2016-2021. The firm was second in the latest ranking in September 2022. The firm regained the #1 ranking in 2023.

For the 42nd consecutive year, Gensler received the highest ranking on Interior Design magazine's "Top 100 Giants" list in 2023.

In 2023, Gensler maintained the top position on Architectural Record's Top 300 Architecture Firms for the 12th consecutive year.

The AIA honoured Gensler’s repositioning of Willis Tower with the 2023 AIA National Interior Architecture Award and awarded adaptive reuse project 633 Folsom the 2023 AIA National Architecture Award.

The Center for Active Design awarded Gensler with as the company with the "Most Ambassadors" (All Time), as the company with the most Fitwel Accredited staff, in the 2023 Best in Building Health Awards.

For the ninth consecutive year, Gensler received the #1 rank overall in Building Design's 2024 World Architecture 100 rankings.

== Notable projects ==
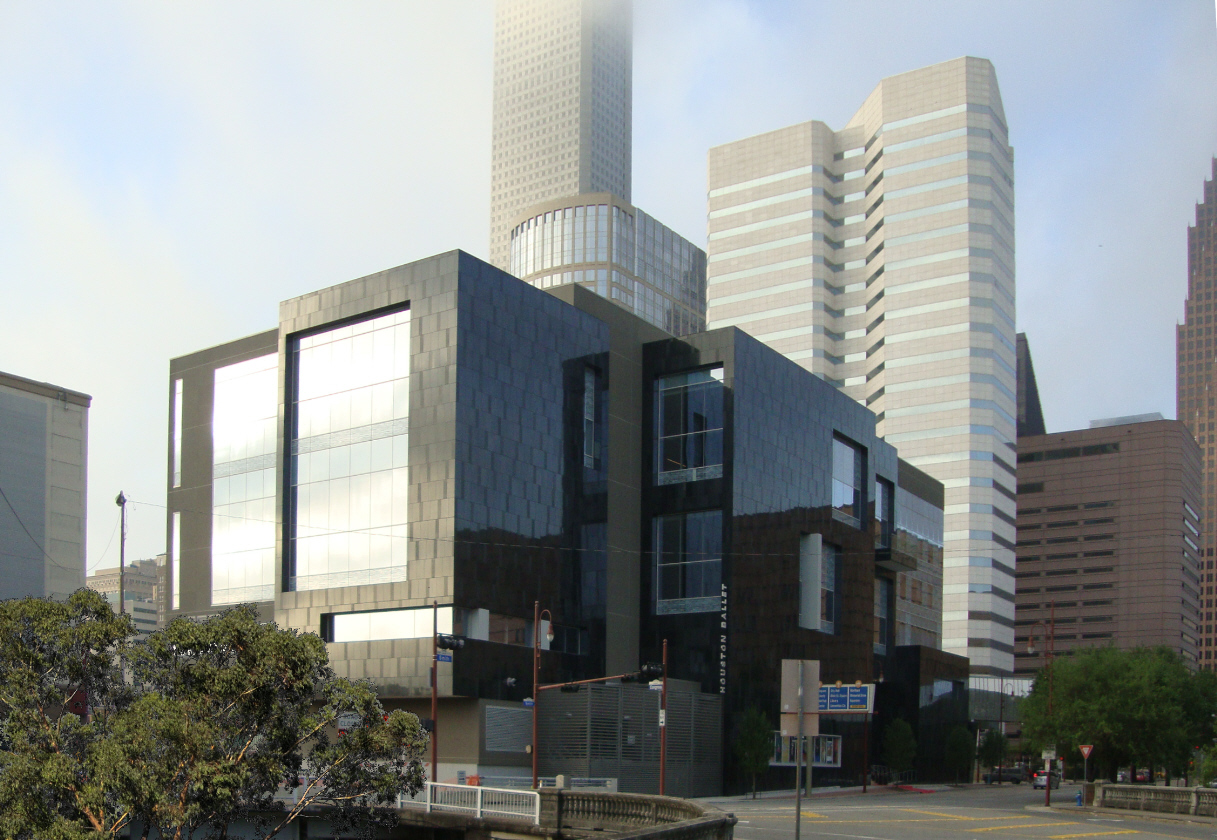
Houston Ballet Centre for Dance, Houston, Texas.

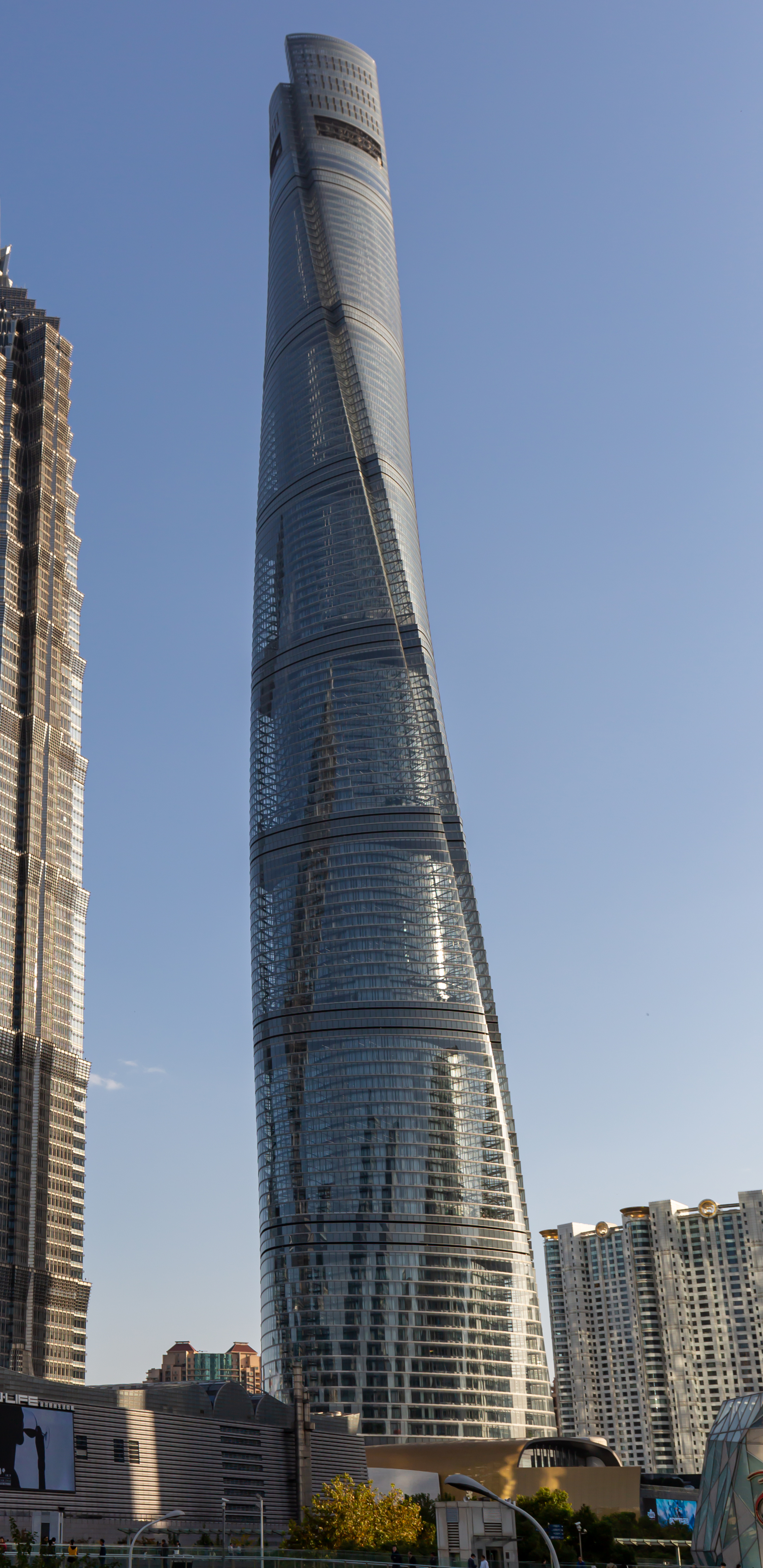
The Shanghai Tower in Shanghai, China is the third tallest building in the world as of 2026.

- RWJ Barnabas Health Red Bulls Performance Center, Morris Township, New Jersey, 2026
- Sixth and Guadalupe, Austin, Texas, 2024
- 1888 Studios, Bayonne, New Jersey, 2022
- 21st Century Fox, 1211 Avenue of the Americas, New York, NY, 2018
- 2000 Avenue of the Stars, Los Angeles, California, 2007
- Banc of California Stadium, Los Angeles, California, 2018
- BCG NY Headquarters, New York, New York, 2017
- Burj Alshaya Four Seasons, Kuwait City, Kuwait, 2017
- Cadillac House, New York, New York, 2017
- Costa Rica Convention Center, Heredia, Costa Rica, 2018
- Condé Nast Headquarters, New York, New York, 2015
- CityCenter, Las Vegas, Nevada, 2009
- Cabanas, Pavilions, Pool, Screening Room & Underground Tunnel Network, Little Saint James, 2007-2011
- DreamWorks Animation, Glendale, California, 1997
- Mineta San Jose International Airport Terminal B, San Jose, California, 2010
- Tŷ William Morgan, Cardiff, United Kingdom, 2020
- The Doughnut, Cheltenham United Kingdom, 2003
- The Avenues, Phase IV, Kuwait City, Kuwait, 2018
- NVIDIA Corporate Campus, Santa Clara, California, 2018
- Ford Foundation Center for Social Justice, New York, New, 2018
- Incheon International Airport, T2, Incheon, South Korea, 2018
- Westfield Century City, Los Angeles, California, 2018
- Fairmont Austin, Austin, Texas, 2018
- Johnson Controls HQ Asia Pacific, Shanghai, China, 2017
- E. & J. Gallo Winery Dry Creek Building, Modesto, California, 2017
- Hyatt Headquarters, Chicago, Illinois, 2017
- The Coca-Cola Company Headquarters, Atlanta, Georgia, 2016
- The Washington Post, Washington, DC, 2016
- Westin DEN and Transit Center, Denver, Colorado, 2015
- Jackson Hole Airport, Jackson Hole, Wyoming, 2015
- Shanghai Tower, Shanghai, China, 2015
- The Tower at PNC Plaza, Pittsburgh, Pennsylvania, 2014
- Gratz Center, Fourth Presbyterian Church, Chicago, Illinois, 2012
- San Francisco International Airport Terminal 2, San Francisco, California, 2011
- Ritz-Carlton Hotel and Residences and JW Marriott at L.A. LIVE, Los Angeles, California, 2010
- John F. Kennedy International Airport, JetBlue T5, New York City, New York, 2008
- The New York Times Building, New York, New York, 2007
- Letterman Digital Arts Center, Presidio of San Francisco, California, 2005
- The Gate, Dubai International Finance Centre, Dubai, UAE, 2004
- Moscone Center, San Francisco, California, 2003
- Harborplace Redevelopment – Baltimore, Maryland (2023–present)
- Al Ahly SC Stadium – Cairo, Egypt (2025–present)
- Universal United Kingdom – Bedfordshire, United Kingdom (2026–present)
