= Frost Bank Tower =

Skyscraper in Austin, Texas

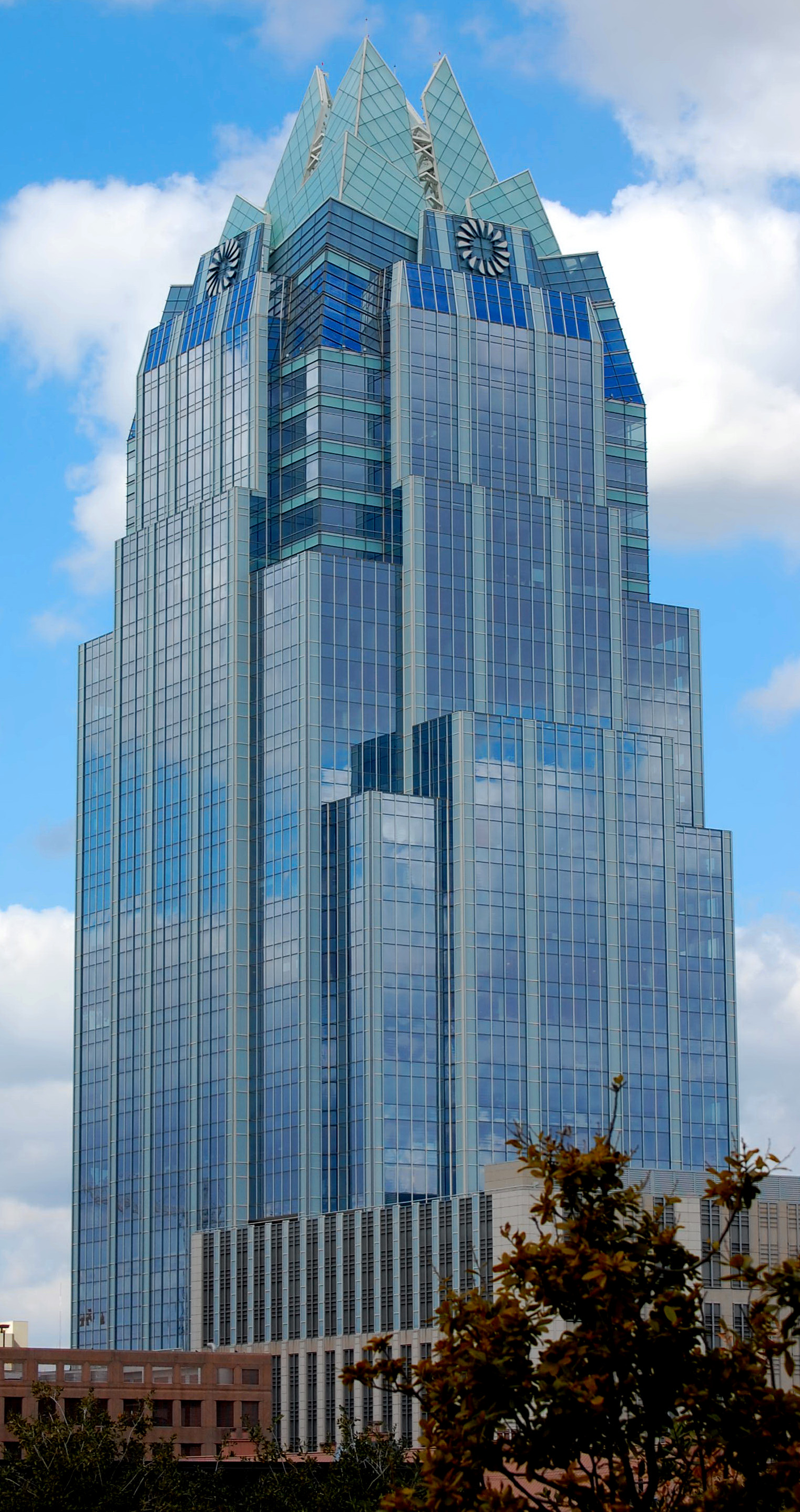
- The Frost Bank Tower in 2009
- Alternative names: FBT, Congress at Fourth, Fourth & Congress

General information
- Status: Completed
- Type: Office
- Location: 401 Congress Avenue, Austin, Texas, U.S.
- Coordinates: 30.266489°N 97.742689°W
- Construction started: November 27, 2001
- Completed: 2003
- Opening: January 23, 2004
- Cost: $137 million

Height
- Roof: 515 ft (157 m)
- Top floor: 400 ft (122 m)

Technical details
- Floor count: 33
- Floor area: 545,000 sq ft (50,600 m^{2})
- Lifts/elevators: 15

Design and construction
- Architects: HKS, Inc., Duda/Paine Architects
- Developer: Cousins Properties
- Structural engineer: Brockette Davis Drake
- Main contractor: Constructors & Associates Inc.

Website
- frosttoweraustin.com

The Frost Bank Tower is a skyscraper in Austin, Texas, United States. Standing 515 ft (157 m) tall with 33 floors, it is the 15th tallest building in Austin. It was developed by Cousins Properties from November 2001 to December 2003 as a class A office building with 525,000 sq ft (48,800 m^{2}) of leasable space. It was the first high-rise building to be constructed in the United States after the 9/11 attacks. The building was officially dedicated in January 2004.

The Frost Bank Tower was designed by Duda/Paine Architects, LLP and HKS, Inc. It carries the highest logo in the city at 420 ft (128 m). This advertises the San Antonio–based Frost Bank, whose Austin headquarters and insurance division are in the building. Tenants in the building besides Frost Bank include the Austin offices of Morgan Stanley, Ernst & Young, and PIMCO. The silvery blue color glass facade was first used on the Reuters Building in New York City. Cousins sold the building in 2006 to EQ Office for $188 million before the building was sold to Thomas Properties Group the same year. In 2013, ownership of the building transferred to Parkway Properties. The building is currently owned by Endeavor Real Estate Group.

== History ==
Beginning in 1998, a joint venture composed of Civitas Investments, Highgate Holdings, and T. Stacy & Associates (collectively Block 42 Congress Partners) consolidated tracts of land at the building site on the intersection of 4th Street and Congress Avenue. At the time, the city block included a row of brick buildings and the Mexic-Arte Museum. In June 1999, plans for a 27-story, 495,000 ft^{2} (46,000 m^{2}) office and retail building were unveiled by the joint venture that would occupy three-quarters of the block, replacing the brick buildings and preserving the museum. Development of the site was complicated by the lease on the museum and municipal limits on building heights to preserve views of the Texas State Capitol. Block 42 Congress Partners acquired all of the land required for the project by August 1999, but ultimately sold the 1.7-acre (0.69 ha) lot to Cousins Properties in January 2001 for $13.8 million. While the initial design for the building from Block 42 Congress Partners called for a 352 ft (107 m) tall building with 27 floors, the Cousins Properties design called for a 515 ft (157 m) tall office building with 33 floors, over 500,000 ft^{2} (46,000 m^{2}) of space, and a plaza.

Frost Bank Tower at night in 2014.

The building was to be the first new high rise on Congress Avenue in two decades. Initial clearing and demolition of the preexisting buildings on the site began in November 2001. Work on the project continued despite an ongoing recession, rising office vacancy rates in Downtown Austin, and a downgrade of Cousins Properties's stock rating by Merrill Lynch in response to the project's announcement. Construction of the tower began on November 27, 2001; at the time, the building was the tallest in the U.S. to begin construction after the September 11 attacks.

In March 2003, Frost Bank announced plans to move its downtown Austin operations into the skyscraper, signing a lease for 52,000 ft^{2} (4,800 m^{2}) of office space and becoming the building's lead tenant; in response, Cousins Properties renamed the building after the bank. The building's retail space was fully leased in April 2003 with the addition of a McCormick & Schmick's restaurant. Frost Bank Tower topped out on May 28, 2003, including the final concrete pour and the hoisting of a 30 ft (9.1 m) cedar tree onto the top of the building as part of the topping out ceremony. A tin cross was also ceremonially embedded into the concrete on each floor. In August 2003, the total cost of the building was estimated at $137 million. It became the tallest building in Austin, Texas, and the fourth tallest building outside of Dallas and Houston, Texas, (excluding the Tower of the Americas in San Antonio). The 99 ft (30 m) crown atop the building was ceremonially illuminated for the first time on the night of January 21, 2004. Over 700 people attended the event, including Turan Duda, the skyscraper's lead architect.

After Austin's skyscraper construction boom, which began in 2007, Frost Bank Tower was soon surpassed in height by the 360 Condominiums at 581 ft (177 m) in 2008. As of March 2011, it is the 54th tallest building in Texas. In 2006, Cousins Properties sold the building for $188 million to EQ Office, which eventually sold it to Thomas Properties Group. Currently, there are many notable tenants in the building, including Frost Bank, Morgan Stanley, Ernst & Young, PIMCO, UTIMCO, and Heritage Title Co.

== Architecture ==
Frost Bank Tower lit with different colors.

Designed by Duda/Paine Architects with HKS, Inc. as the Architect of Record, the Frost Bank Tower is considered one of the most recognizable buildings in Austin. The building starts with a rectangular shape on the ground that eventually becomes a square point in the crown. The base of the building is expressed in honed finish limestone while the main superstructure of the building is a blue low-e glass skin, which is a thicker type of glass, that covers the entire tower. The Frost Bank Tower is one of only two places in the world with blue low-e glass skin, the other being the Reuters Building in New York City.

The folded panes of the building step back to create a segmented pyramidal form. Lighting is built into the crown, where a section of the building 150 ft (46 m) lights up. Occasionally, the lights change color for special occasions, such as the 2006 Rose Bowl, when the Austin-based University of Texas Longhorns defeated the USC Trojans. More than 200,000 sq ft (60,960 sq m) of glass was used for the facade of the building alone and 45,000 sq ft (13,716 sq m) of glass was used in the crown. The building also contains an 11 level parking garage with spaces for more than 1,400 vehicles.

=== Critics' responses ===
The Frost Bank Tower's design received a polarized response upon its completion. Austin American-Statesman columnist John Kelso compared the building's crown to an enormous set of nose hair trimmers. Jeanne Claire van Ryzin, a Statesman art critic, opined that the "jagged form of the crown looks more like a riff on the post-modern ornamentation of the 1980s than any kind of newly inspired form."

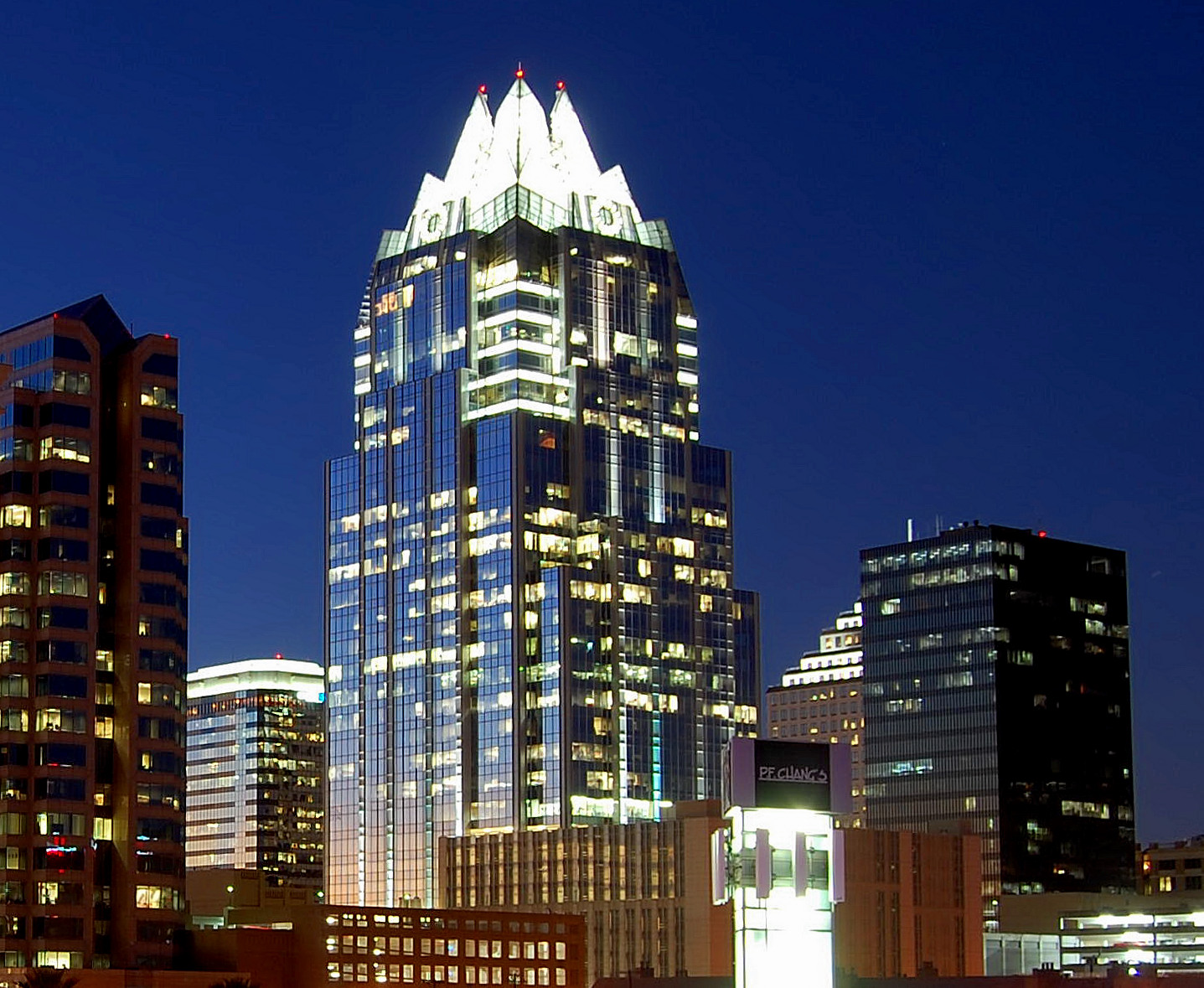
Frost Bank Tower in the Austin skyline.

Austin Chronicle readers voted the Frost Bank Tower as the "Best New Building (Past Five Years)" in 2004, 2006, 2007, and 2008. It was also voted for best architecture in 2004 and 2005. The newspaper also said that the "owl face of the Frost Bank Tower" helps keep Austin "characteristically weird". The tower was awarded the 2005 International Association of Lighting Designers (IALD) Award of Merit for lighting design by Cline Bettridge Bernstein Lighting Design for its "second set of narrowly focused accent lights that showcase the vertical mullions at the setback near the building top" and "monumental custom sconces that add scale and create a welcoming frame around the opening portals of the lobby". The building also won the 2003 Texas Construction Magazine Award of Merit.

=== Amenities ===
The Frost Bank Tower contains a wide variety of amenities. Such amenities in the building include conference facilities, building concierge, 24-hour cardkey access, fully equipped fitness center, state-of-the-art telecommunication systems, tenant controlled HVAC, upscale restaurants, deli/carry-out restaurants, a coffee shop, and a dry-cleaner. Following the builders tradition, a tin Christian cross was embedded into the concrete of each floor during construction, with the last being added on May 27, 2003. The idea came from a story of an immigrant who worked on construction during the 1940s in New York City. Also, a 30-foot (9.1 m) cedar tree was hoisted to the top of the mechanical penthouse during the topping out ceremony.

== Position in Austin's skyline ==
At the time of its construction in 2004, the Frost Bank Tower was the tallest building in Austin and a centerpiece to the skyline. In 2025 it was ranked as the 15th tallest completed building. The building covers most of its block, which is located near the center of downtown at 4th Street and Congress Avenue.

== Gallery ==
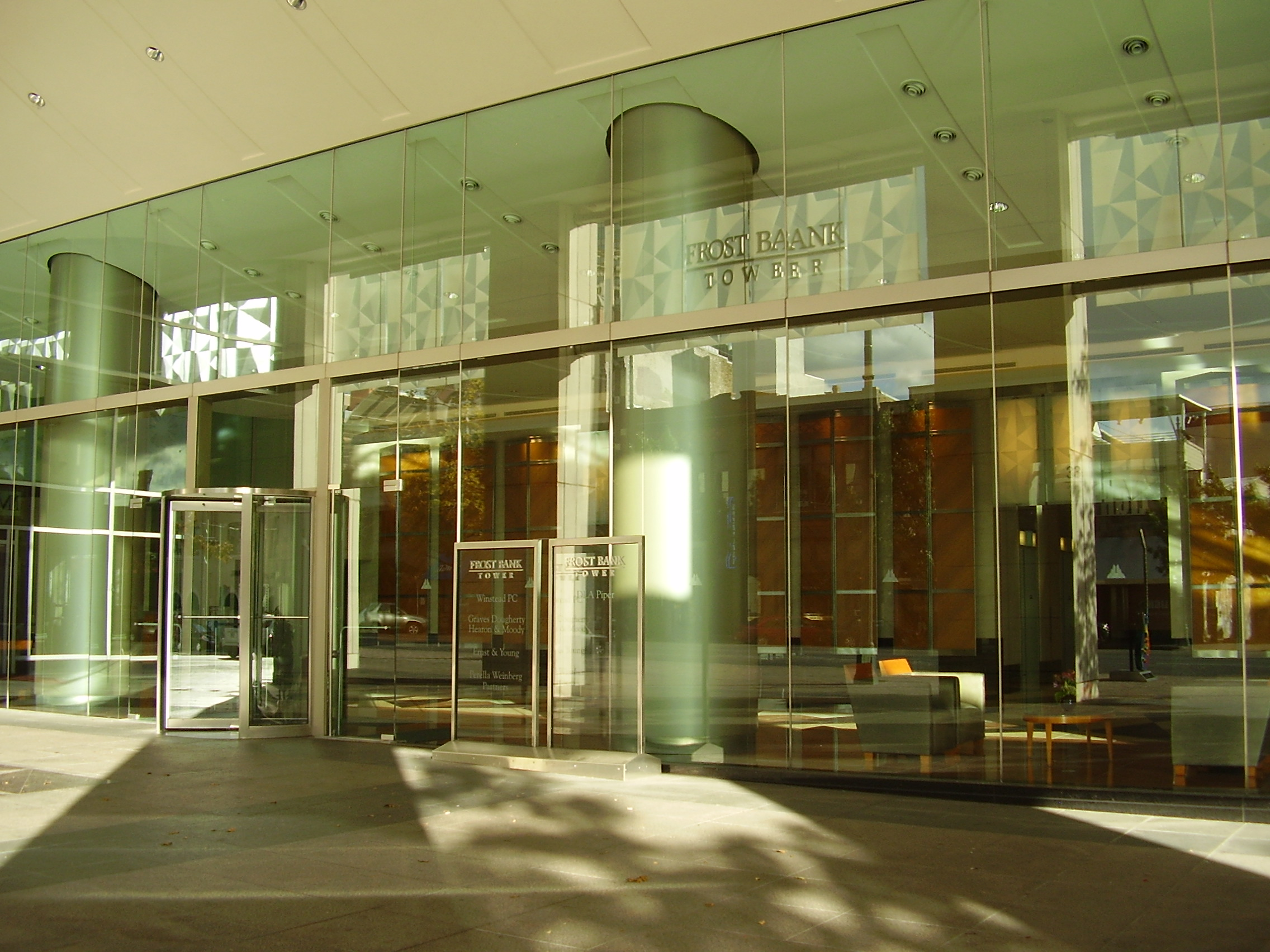
Lobby of the tower

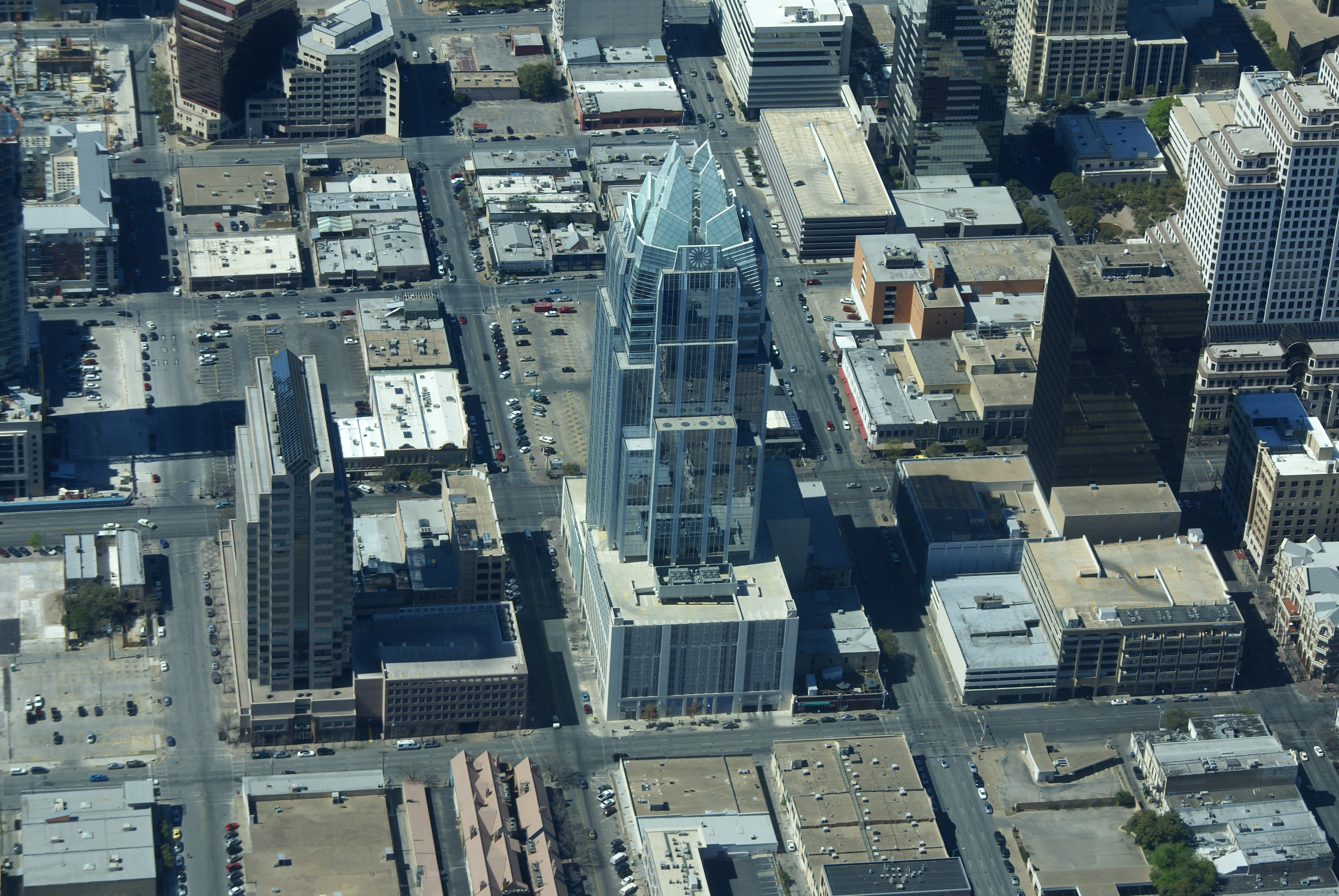
Aerial view of Frost Tower from 1,500 ft (457 m)

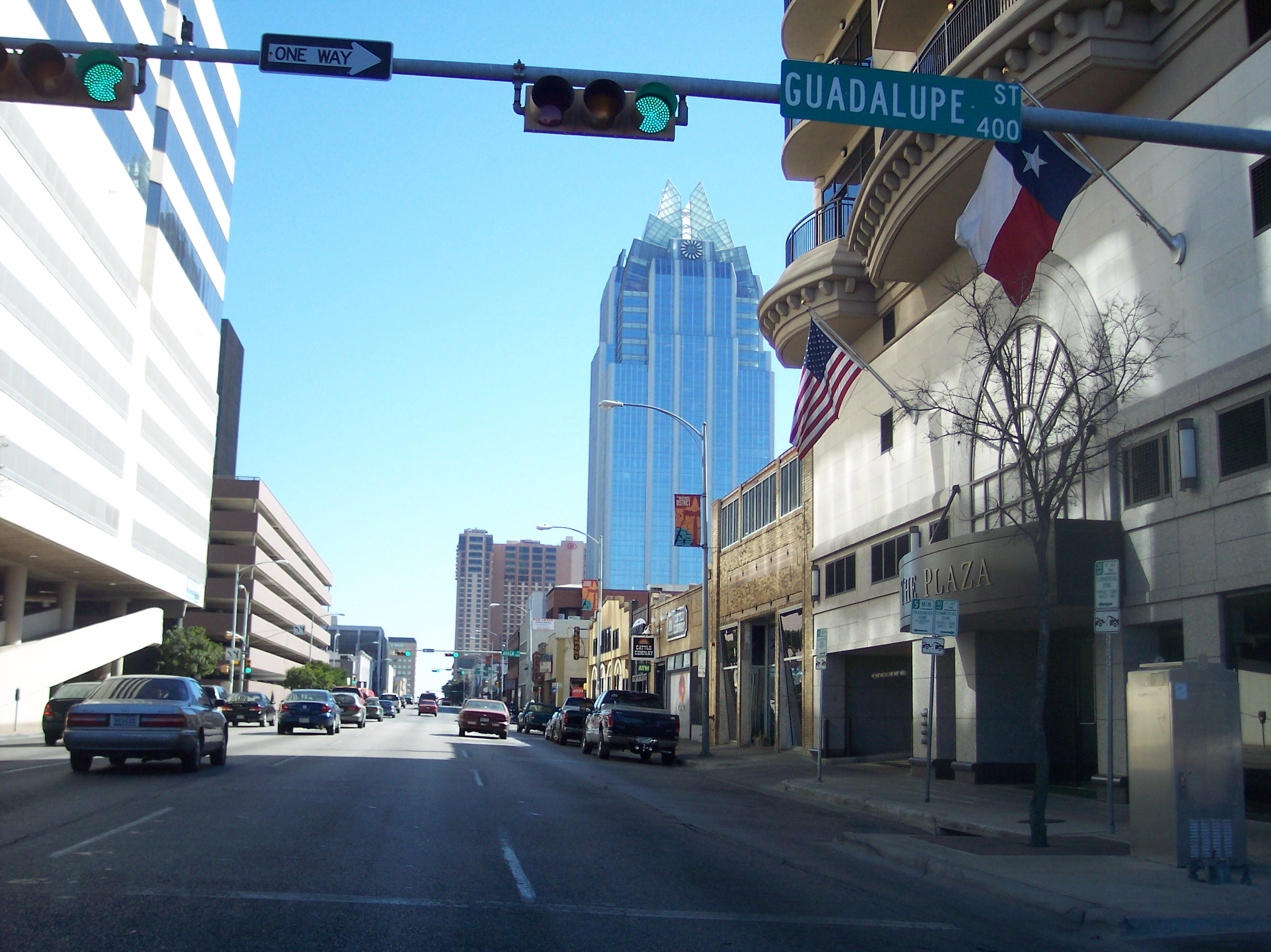
Street view from the corner of 5th Street and Guadalupe Avenue

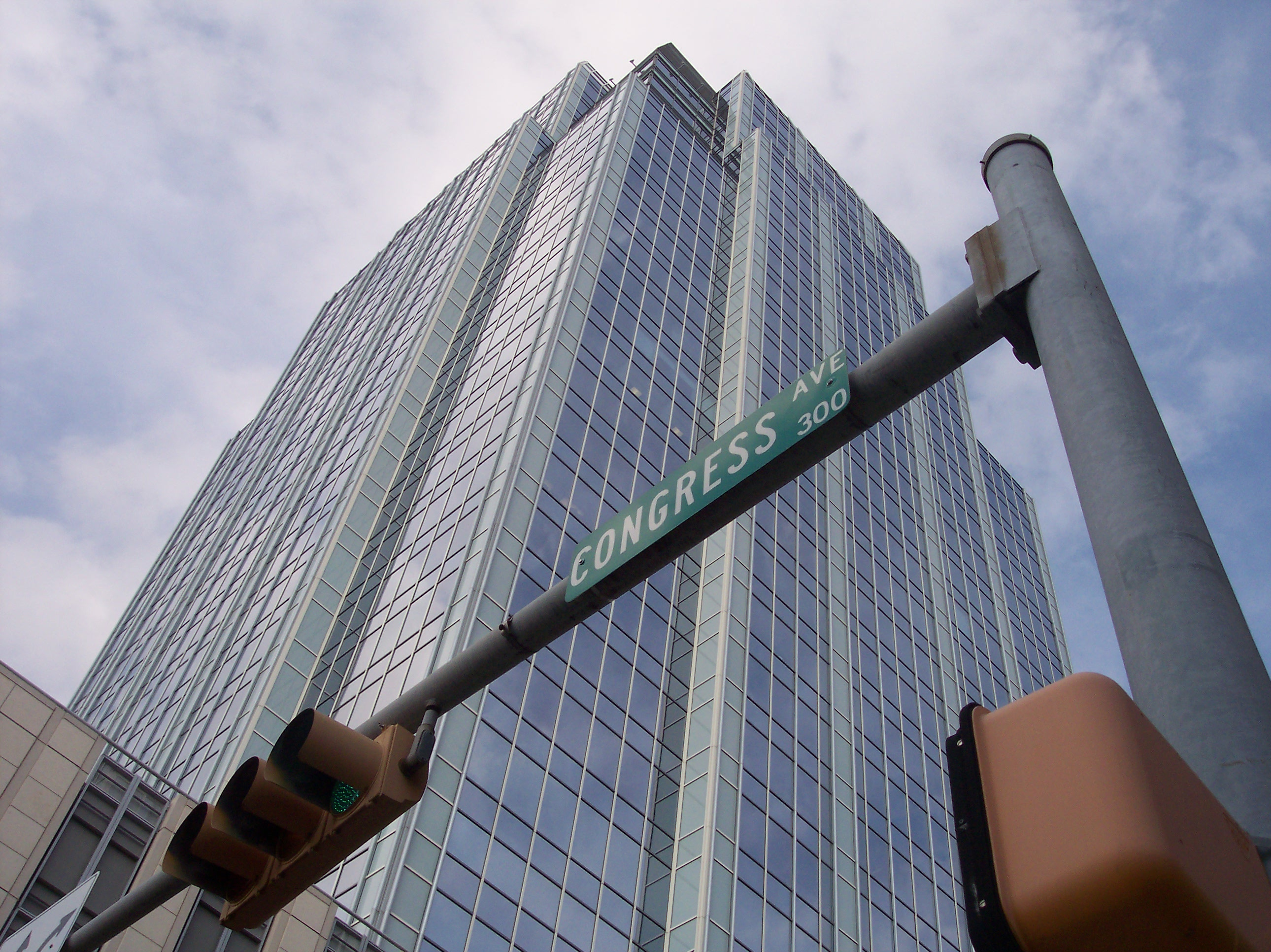
Street view from Congress Avenue

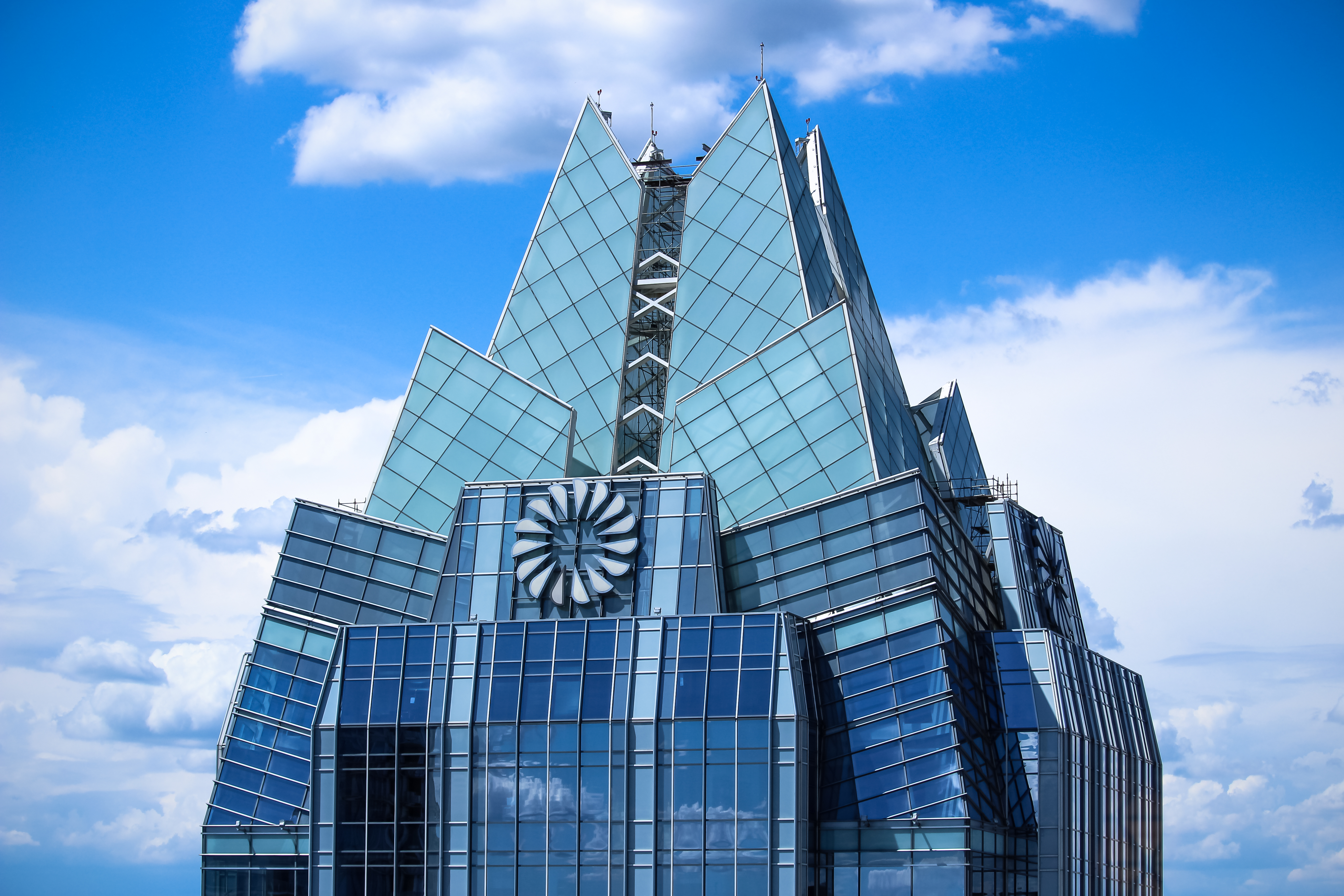
Close-up view from the 34th floor of a neighboring building

== See also ==
- Sixth Street
- Downtown Austin
- The Austonian
- List of tallest buildings in Austin

Preceded by One American Center	Tallest Building in Austin; 2004—2008; 515 ft (157 m)	Succeeded by 360 Condominiums
