= EAH =

EAH may refer to:

- 5-epiaristolochene 1,3-dihydroxylase
- EAH Housing
- Einstein@Home
- Exercise-associated hyponatremia
- Ever After High
