= Emory Point =

Mixed-use development in Druid Hills, Georgia, US

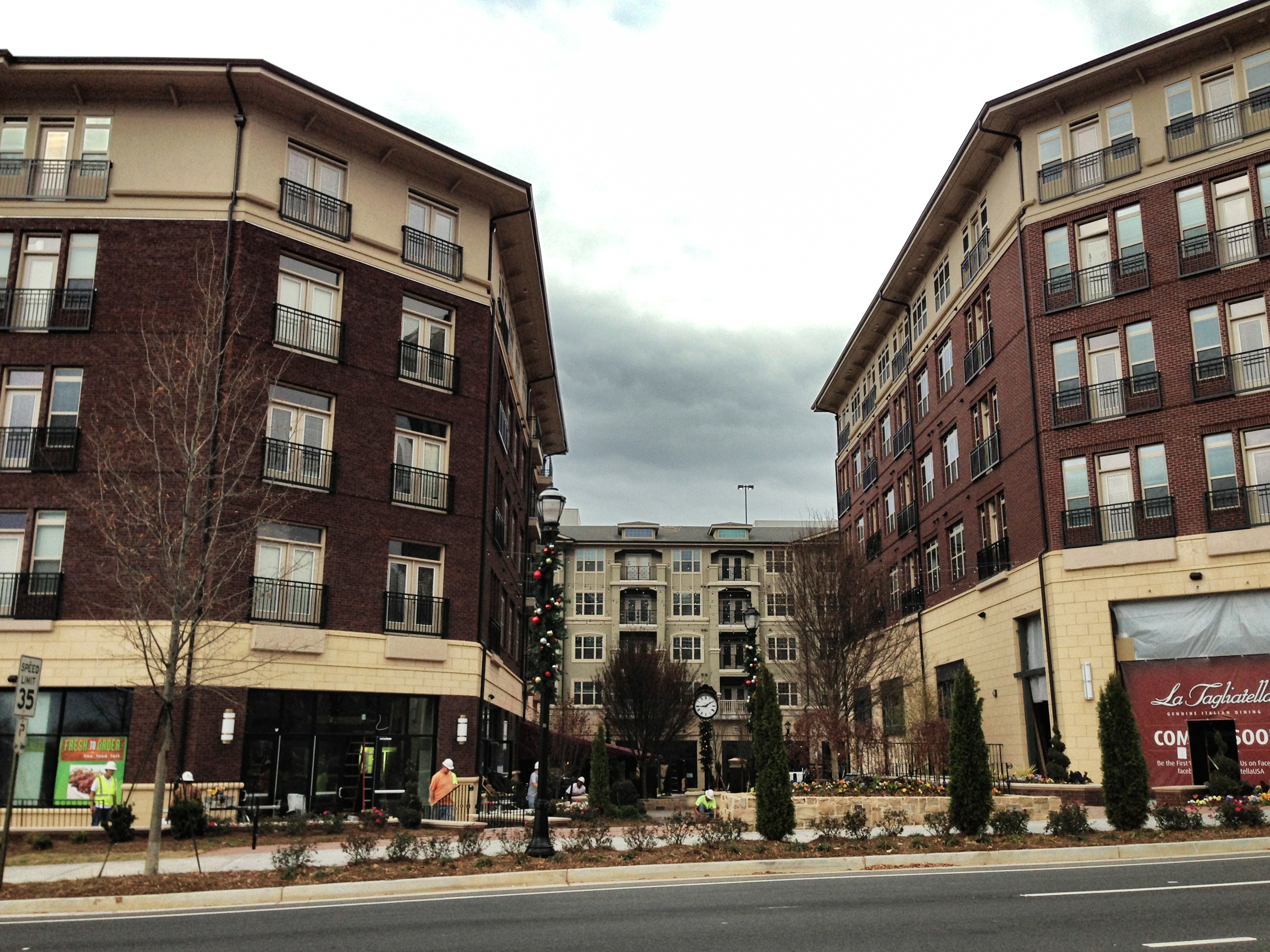
- Middle of complex with clock in 2012

- Location within Atlanta

General information
- Status: Completed
- Type: Mixed-use complex
- Location: Clifton Road, Druid Hills, DeKalb County, Georgia, United States
- Coordinates: 33.801428°N 84.328°W
- Current tenants: CVS Pharmacy and Loft, et al.
- Construction started: July 2011
- Completed: Fall 2012 (Phase I)
- Opened: 2012
- Owner: Blackstone Inc.

Design and construction
- Architect: Cooper Carry
- Architecture firm: The Preston Partnership
- Structural engineer: Ellinwood + Machado LLC; Pruitt Eberly Stone, Inc.
- Main contractor: Fortune-Johnson Contracting

Website
- emory-point.com

Emory Point is a mixed-use development on Clifton Road in Druid Hills, unincorporated DeKalb County, Georgia, adjacent to Atlanta. It is across Clifton Road from the Centers for Disease Control and Prevention and surrounded on three sides by the campus of Emory University.

The complex is located on "The Cliff" Emory University shuttle line.

The complex contains 80,000 square feet (7,400 m^{2}) of retail space and 443 apartments. The total cost of development was variously quoted as US$60 million to US$250 million.

== History ==
The project was originally planned in 2006 as a 315,000 square feet (29,300 m^{2}) condominium complex only. It was stopped in 2008 as the Great Recession deepened but was finally completed in 2012.

Construction began in 2012 with the demolition of the Emory Inn, a hotel on the site.

At its opening in Fall 2012, Emory Point was the first new retail project built in the area in 20 years, the largest private development start inside the Perimeter in three years, and the first partnership between Cousins Properties (75%) and Gables Residential (25%), two Atlanta-based development companies.

Tenants included Tenants included CVS Pharmacy, JoS. A. Bank Clothiers, Ann Taylor Loft, Bonefish Grill, Fresh to Order, and Which Wich? well as other chain and independent stores and restaurants. As of December 2012, twenty-one shops and restaurants were either open or lined up to open by February 2013. However, most of these tenants have left the development as of 2025.

== Gallery ==
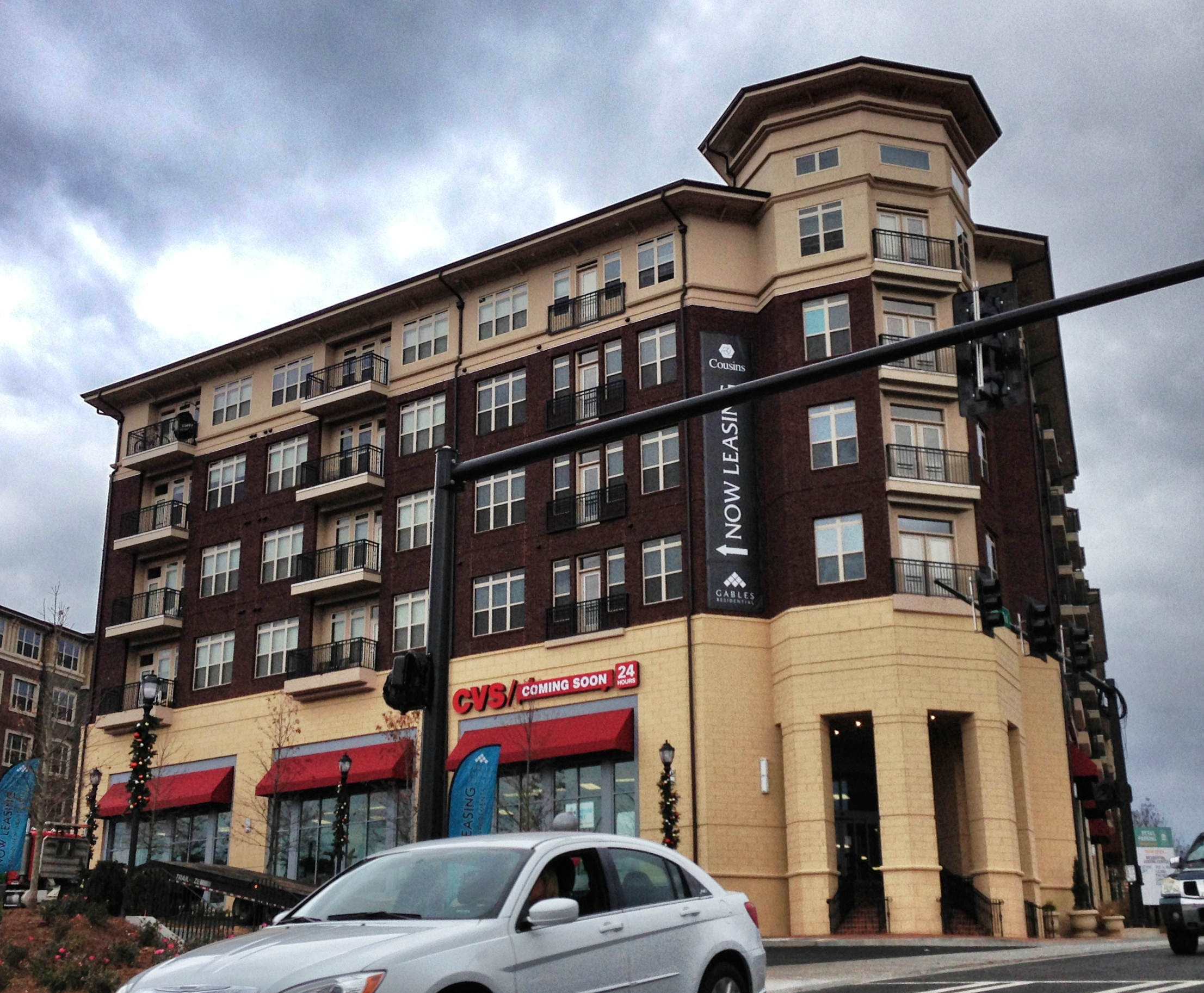
Complex seen from west; CVS Pharmacy

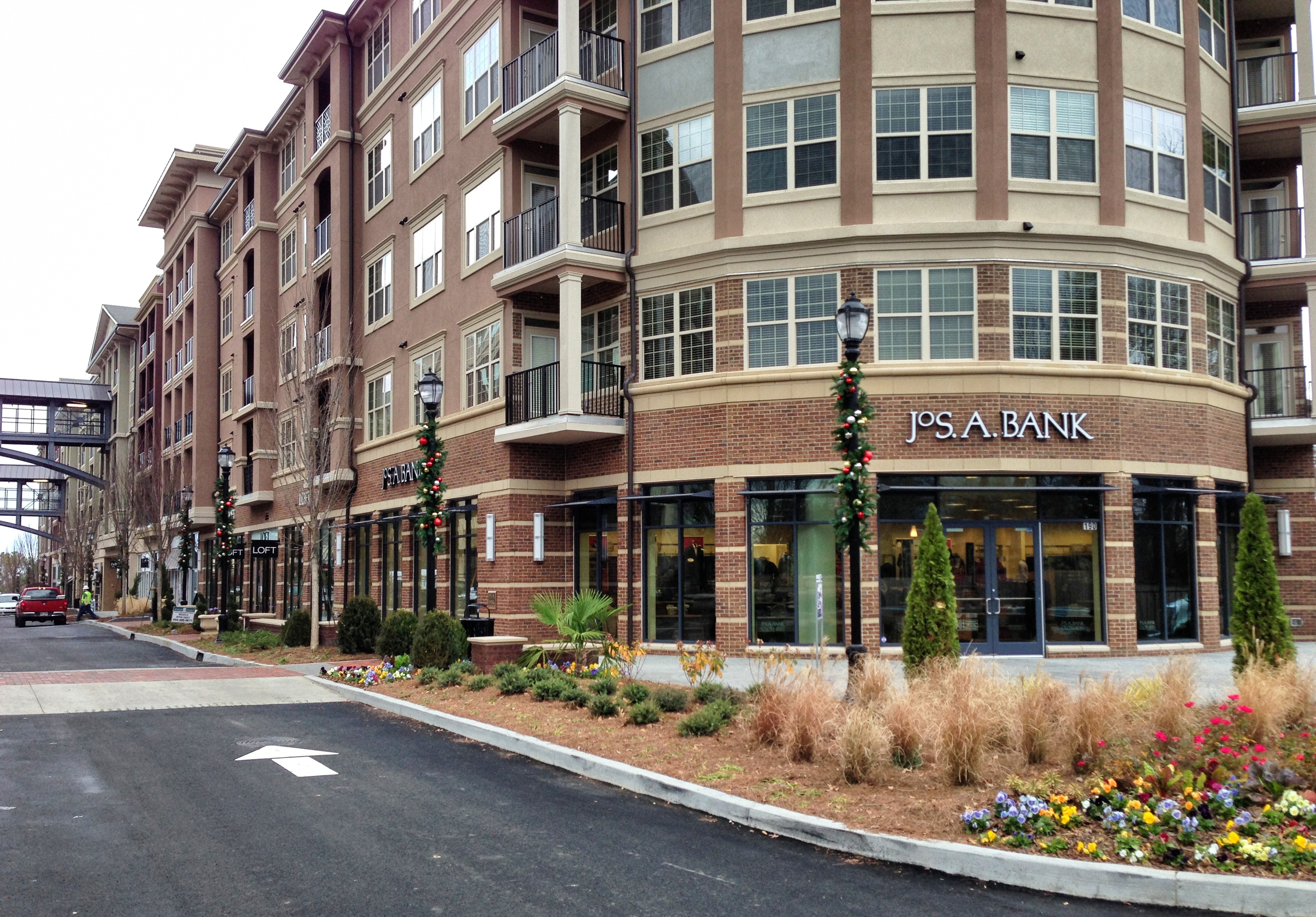
JoS. A. Bank Clothiers and Ann Taylor Loft stores

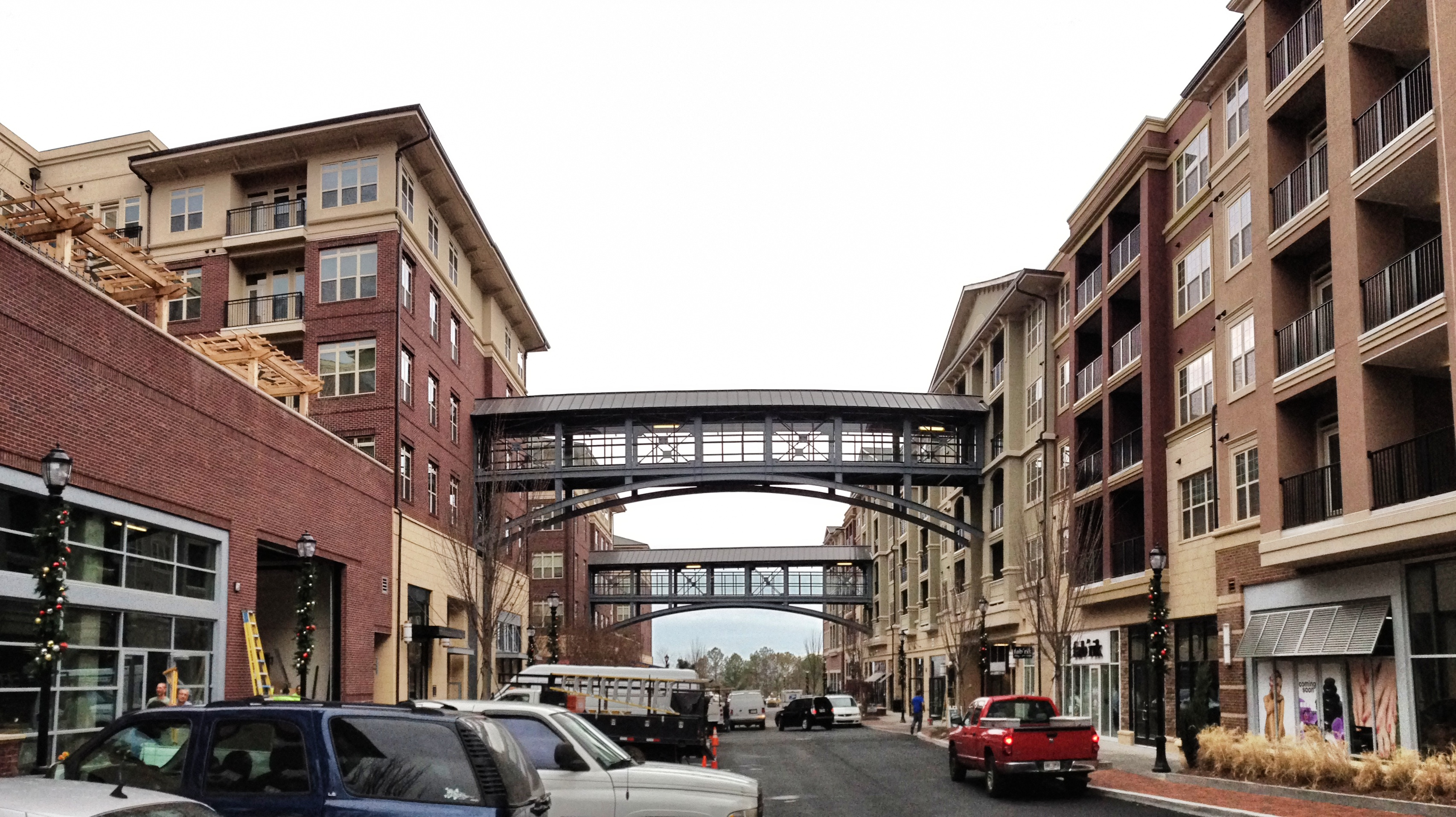
Pedestrian bridges inside complex

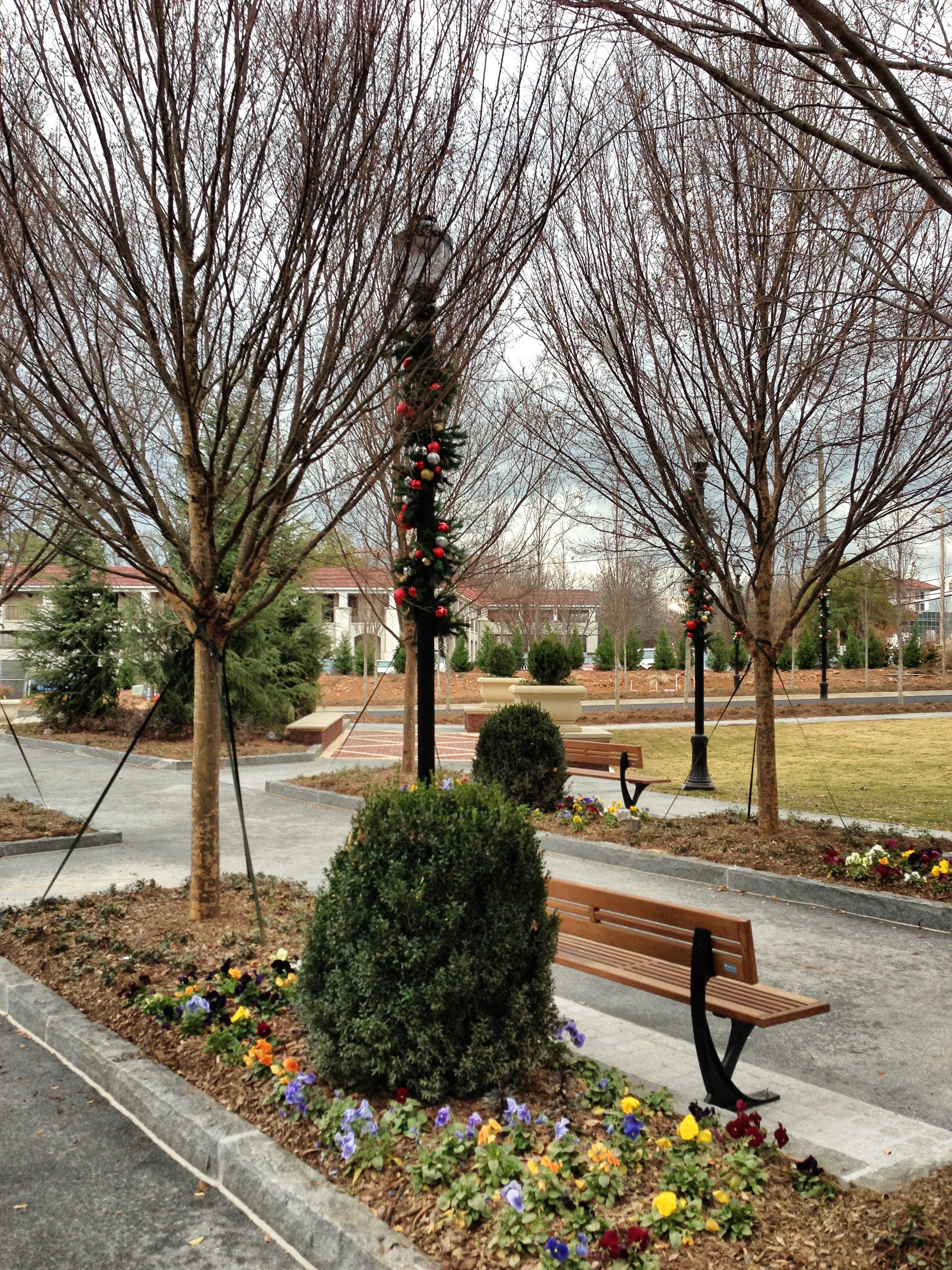
Gardens inside complex

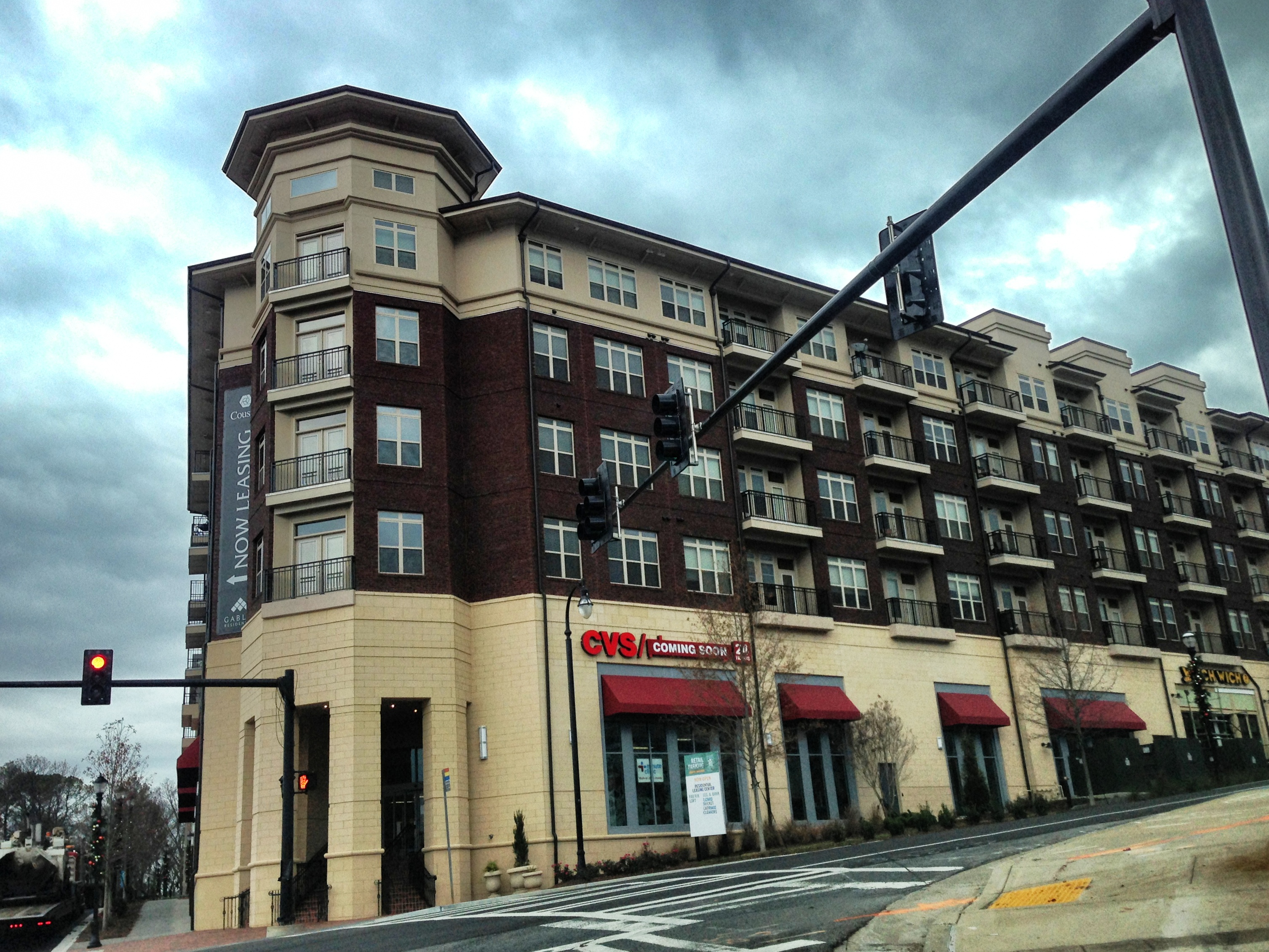
West end of complex as seen from CDC entrance

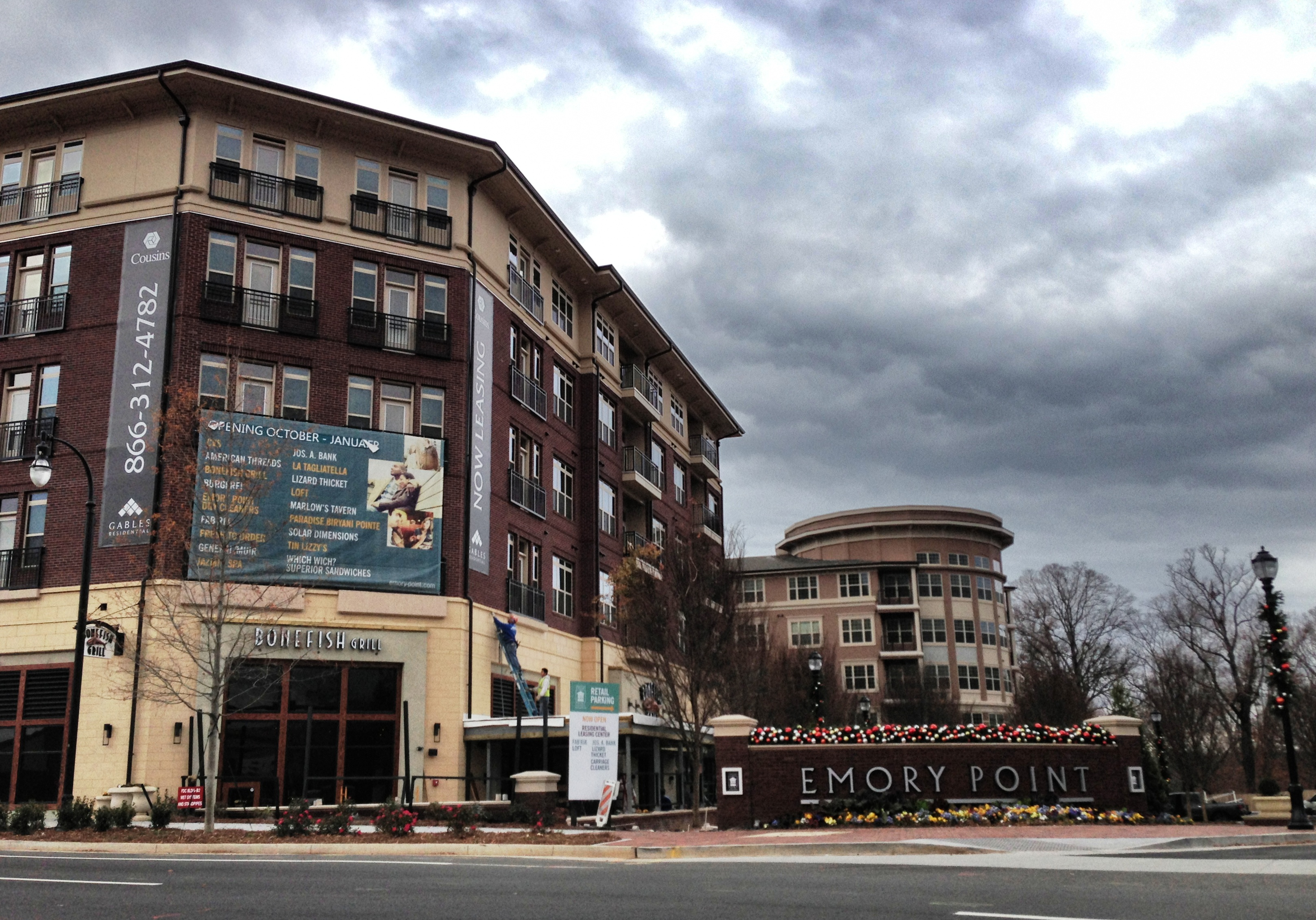
East end of complex and main "Emory Point" sign
