= California Sustainability Alliance =

American organization

- Industry: Sustainability
- Founded: 2008
- Area served: California, United States
- Website: www.sustainca.org

The California Sustainability Alliance is an organization founded by the California IOUs, to facilitated discussions between various industries on the issues of resource sustainability. The Alliance was set up in 2008 to help California meet its goals in facing Climate change in the State, in relation to energy, resources, and the environment. Efforts are directed at increasing and accelerating sustainable measures and strategies. The Alliance specifically focuses on energy efficiency, climate action, “smart growth” principles, renewable energy development, water-use efficiency, waste management, and transportation management within California.

== Function ==
The Alliance's main functions include sharing and developing toolkits, resources and pilot programs that aid in the planning and implementation of sustainability initiatives within California. These tools and resources include:

- California Local Energy Efficiency Program (CALeep): Designed to help California's local governments plan and implement highly effective energy efficiency initiatives in their communities.
- Emerald California Pilot Program: Emerald Cities is designed to help local governments adopt ‘reach goals’ that go beyond simply complying with State environmental mandates, and implement sustainability programs that support California's environmental priorities. The Alliance is the lead implementer of this California Department of Conservation pilot program.
- Green General Plan Toolkit: Recognizes five key sustainability principles that local governments may wish to consider in developing their green general plans: strategic emissions reduction, smart land use & planning, responsible resource use, integrated transportation, and innovative waste management.
- Green Leases Toolkit: This toolkit supports tenants and landlords in developing their own green leasing policies and requirements; measuring and comparing the green attributes of different buildings, developing specific lease language and communicating policies and requirements to the market.
- Green Tenant Guide: This guide helps organizations learn how to work with their staff to set clear and feasible sustainability goals, establish buy-in and excitement, define metrics, and measure and communicate results.
- Local Government Green Procurement Guide: A guidebook to help local governments adopt an environmentally friendly procurement purchasing plan. This guidebook provides local government staff and decision-makers with a variety of tools and resources to help them implement green purchasing programs.
- Local Government Operations Protocol Toolkit: A tool for accounting and reporting Greenhouse gas emissions across a local government's operations. It was adopted by the California Air Resources Board (CARB) in September 2008 for local governments to develop and report consistent and accurate GHG inventories and to help meet California's AB 32 GHG reduction obligations.
- Local Government Resources Toolkit: This resource helps cities and counties identify and locate tools and funding sources to help their communities set and meet sustainability goals.

== Sustainability Showcase Awards ==
The California Sustainability Alliance began distinguishing organizations through the creation of their Annual Sustainability Showcase Awards (in 2008, 2009 and 2010). The Alliance awards were given to organizations within California that had successfully implemented sustainable policies, programs, practices and technologies.

The 2008 winners included:

- Inland Empire Utility Agency, recognized for their innovation in integrated resource management and best-in-class projects ranging from energy efficient water operations and renewable energy usage to their LEED Platinum headquarters.
- Thomas Properties Group, recognized for its leadership in greening California's real estate which included their partnership with the State and Consumer Services Agency to make the California Environmental Protection Agency headquarters building. one of the greenest in the country.
- University of California, recognized for its excellent environmental leadership and customer-initiated partnership through which students, employees and administrators are successfully collaborating through the Policy on Sustainable Practices to address climate change, sustainable transportation, green buildings, and waste reduction through all ten campuses.

The 2009 winners included:

- Jones Lang LaSalle, recognized for their efforts to minimize buildings' environmental impacts by creating real value energy and sustainability for their clients and within their own operations.
- Los Angeles Housing Partnership, recognized as a leader within the affordable housing industry due to its early adoption of sustainable practices, energy efficiency, renewable resources, water efficiency, smart growth and more.
- Town of Los Gatos, recognized for their employee and community commitment to promote and implement sustainability programs and practices.
- City of Santa Monica, recognized as an early adopter of sustainable practices throughout all aspects of their local government and awarded the 2009 Grand Prize Winner by the Alliance.
- County of San Diego, recognized for building strong sustainable communities by working with their internal departments as well as partnering with local utilities and organizations to maximize adoption of sustainability best practices.
- Sonoma County Water Agency, recognized for their commitment to provide carbon-free water by 2015 and for all of their sustainable programs and best practices that are helping them achieve this goal.
- Los Angeles Community College District, recognized for working with leading environmental organizations and for developing innovative sustainability policies, including LACCD Builds Green campus projects, that place them on the forefront of social and environmental responsibility.

The 2010 winners included:

- Balboa Park Cultural Partnership, distinguished for their Environmental Sustainability Program, which has fostered great collaboration among the Park's institutions, developed social and environmental metrics to measure success, and implemented a number of energy saving, renewable resource, and waste reduction measures.
- Eden Housing, distinguished for its high quality affordable housing in Northern California for over 40 years. The company focuses on making all of its business practices sustainable.
- City of Chula Vista, distinguished for its Climate Change Protection Program across all city departments to promote energy efficiency and renewable energy, foster alternative vehicle use, improve water efficiency, and design walkable transit-friendly communities.
- Santa Clara Valley Water District, distinguished for their award-winning water use efficiency and conservation program and its greenhouse gas emission reduction program.

The 2010 honorable mentions included:

- EAH Housing, distinguished for its company-wide sustainability initiatives that cover all areas of operation, from new development, acquisition and rehab to property management and corporate operations.
- City of Tulare, distinguished for its commitment to ensuring sustained economic and environmental vitality for future generations of residents. As part of its efforts, the City has implemented extensive building retrofits and residential solar programs.
