= Sonoma Water =

Agency overview
- Formed: 1949
- Website: www.sonomawater.org

Sonoma Water, formerly known as the Sonoma County Water Agency, maintains a water transmission system that provides naturally filtered Russian River water to more than 600,000 residents in portions of Sonoma County, California and Marin County, California. The Water Agency is a water wholesaler that sells potable water to nine cities and special districts that in turn sell drinking water to their residents. These cities and special districts are: the City of Santa Rosa, Rohnert Park, Cotati, Petaluma, Sonoma, the Town of Windsor, Valley of the Moon Water District, Marin Municipal Water District, and North Marin Water District.

== Mission ==
The mission of the Sonoma Water is to, "effectively manage the water resources in our care for the benefit of people and the environment through resource and environmental stewardship, technical innovation, and responsible fiscal management."

== Board of directors ==
The Sonoma County Board of Supervisors acts as the Sonoma Water's Board of Directors. The Water Agency is a separate legal entity created by State law, having specific limited purposes and powers, and separate sources of funding. The Water Agency is thus different from County departments, which are created by the Board of Supervisors for administrative purposes, but are not separate legal entities.

== Flood control ==
Sonoma Water was created as a special district in 1949 by the California Legislature to provide flood protection and water supply services. Providing flood protection is an important role in this community. The Water Agency has partnered with federal agencies to help build and manage a variety of flood protection projects, including Warm Springs Dam, Spring Lake, Coyote Valley Dam, Matanzas Creek Reservoir, Piner Creek Reservoir, Brush Creek Middle Fork Reservoir, and Spring Creek Reservoir. The Water Agency also manages a proactive stream maintenance program that maintains more than 80 miles of creeks throughout the area.

== Sanitation ==
In 1995, legislation made the Water Agency responsible for managing the county sanitation zones and districts, which provide wastewater collection and treatment, and recycled water distribution and disposal services for approximately 22,000 residences and businesses. The zones include Airport/Larkfield/Wikiup, Geyserville, Penngrove, and Sea Ranch. The sanitation districts include the Occidental, Russian River, Sonoma Valley, and South Park County Sanitation Districts

== Fisheries research and the Biological Opinion ==
The Russian River and its major tributaries is home to three species of fish that are threatened or endangered. These species are the Chinook salmon, the steelhead trout, and the coho salmon. Water Agency staff conducts fisheries research and monitoring activities to support ongoing Agency operations and Endangered Species Act compliance. The Russian River Biological Opinion is a federally mandated 15-year blueprint to help save endangered fish and ensure the region's water supply.

== Groundwater ==
The Water Agency is involved in a number of programs and initiatives to study the groundwater resources of the region through the Santa Rosa Plain Groundwater Program, the Sonoma Valley Groundwater Program, the Stormwater/Groundwater Recharge Program, and the Salt and Nutrient Management Plans.

== Water supply system ==
The Russian River begins in central Mendocino County, about 15 miles north of Ukiah. It drains 1,485 square miles watershed and it stretches 110 miles long. It reaches the Pacific Ocean at the town Jenner, which is located approximately 20 miles west of Santa Rosa. It flows southward until Mirabel Park where the direction changes to westward as it crosses part of the Coast Range. There are five principal tributaries: the East Fork of the Russian River, Big Sulphur Creek, Mark West Creek, Maacama Creek, and Dry Creek.

Three major reservoir projects provide water supply for the Russian River watershed: Lake Pillsbury on the Eel River, Lake Mendocino on the East Fork of the Russian River, and Lake Sonoma on Dry Creek. Lake Mendocino and Lake Sonoma provide water for agriculture, municipal and industrial uses, in addition to maintaining the minimum stream flows required by Agency water rights permits. These minimum stream flows provide recreation and fish passage for salmon and steelhead. Most of the streamflow in the Russian River during the summer is provided by water imported from the Eel River. Streamflows are augmented by releases from Lake Mendocino and Lake Sonoma.

=== Scott Dam and Lake Pillsbury ===
Scott Dam is a concrete gravity dam on the Eel River captures a drainage area of 298 square miles and forms Lake Pillsbury. Lake Pillsbury has a storage capacity of 86,388 acre-feet. Since 1923, the lake stored water for diversion to PG&E's Potter Valley Hydroelectric powerhouse through a tunnel constructed through a mountain ridge. Outflow from the powerhouse flows into the East Fork of the Russian River

=== Coyote Valley Dam and Lake Mendocino ===
Located on the East Fork of the Russian River, Coyote Dam is a rolled earth embankment dam that forms Lake Mendocino. Lake Mendocino is a U.S. Army Corps of Engineers project that began storing water in 1959. It captures a drainage area of about 105 square miles, and provides a total storage capacity of 118,000 acre-feet with a water supply pool of 70,000 acre-feet.

=== Warm Springs Dam and Lake Sonoma ===
https://commons.wikimedia.org/wiki/File%3ASonoma_Lake_aerial_view.jpg

Located about 14 miles northwest of Healdsburg, Warm Springs Dam is a rolled earth embankment dam that forms Lake Sonoma. The Sonoma County Water Agency generates electricity at Warm Springs Dam through a hydroelectric turbine. Located at the confluence of Warm Springs Creek and Dry Creek, this lake began storing water in 1984 and has a total storage capacity of 381,000 acre-feet with a water supply pool of 212,000 acre-feet.

Warm Springs Dam is a multi-purpose reservoir serves as a flood control, water supply and recreational facility. The Water Agency is the local cost-sharing partner for Warm Springs Dam, and determines the amount of water to be released when the lake level is in the water supply pool, and the US Army Corps of Engineers manages flood control releases.

=== Transport ===
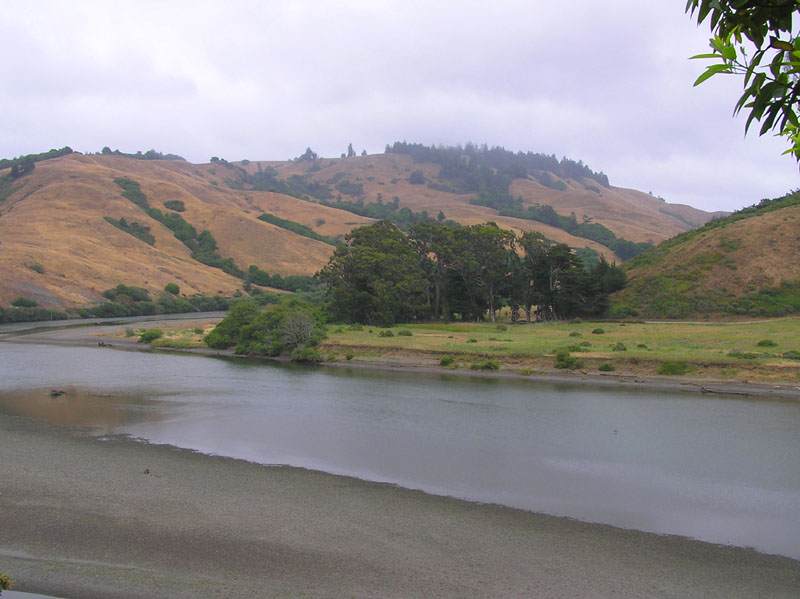
Russian River

- Russian River
- Dry Creek
- Santa Rosa Aqueduct - completed in 1959, 15.6 miles (25.1 km) long
- Petaluma Aqueduct - completed in 1962
- Forestville Aqueduct - completed in 1962
- Sonoma Aqueduct - completed in 1965
- Oakmont Pipeline

== Customers ==
Sonoma Water is a water wholesaler that primarily sells potable water to nine municipalities and water districts in two counties:

- Cotati
- North Marin Water District (serving Novato and environs)
- Marin Municipal Water District (serving southern Marin County)
- Petaluma
- Rohnert Park
- Santa Rosa
- City of Sonoma
- Valley of the Moon Water District
- Windsor

Additionally, there are several smaller water companies and districts in Sonoma County that also receive water from the Agency. These include:

- Forestville Water District
- Cal-Am Water Company - Larkfield/Wikiup
- Penngrove Water Company
- Kenwood Village Water Company
- Lawndale Mutual Water Company

== Organization ==
Formed on October 1, 1949 by Chapter 994 of the California Statues of 1949, the Agency was originally called the Sonoma County Flood Control and Water Conservation District. It has grown with the region it serves and now has an annual budget of over $170 million and employs 197 full-time equivalents.

Although its board of directors is identical to the county's Board of Supervisors, the Agency is a separate legal entity with its own funding. Since 1961, its board has had the right to sell bonds without voter approval.

Its administrative offices are located at 404 Aviation Boulevard in Santa Rosa: 38°30′42″N 122°47′1″W.

== Awards ==
In 2009 the Sonoma County Water Agency was honored with the California Sustainability Alliance's Sustainability Showcase Award. The award commended the Water Agency for their commitment to Carbon-Free Water by 2015 and for their use in innovative sustainability practices, programs, technologies and policies.

== See also ==
- Santa Clara Valley Water District
- Alameda County Water District
- Water in California
