= Parkway Properties =

US real estate investment trust

Parkway Properties, Inc.
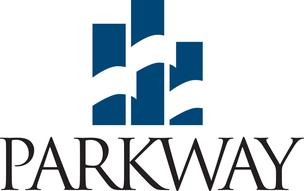
- Where business works
- Industry: Real estate investment trust
- Founded: May 17, 1996; 30 years ago
- Defunct: October 6, 2016; 9 years ago
- Fate: Acquired by Cousins Properties
- Headquarters: Orlando, Florida
- Key people: James R. Heistand (president & CEO)
- Number of employees: 286

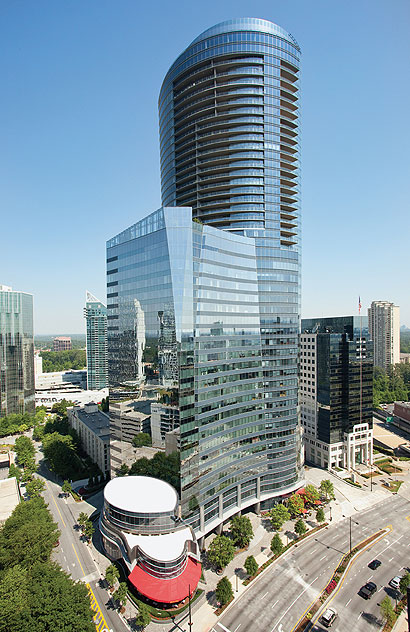
3344 Peachtree was owned by Parkway

Parkway Properties, Inc. was a real estate investment trust that invested in office buildings in the Sun Belt. In 2016, the company was acquired by Cousins Properties.

Notable properties owned by the company included Liberty Place, Phoenix Tower, San Felipe Plaza in Houston Raymond James Tower in Memphis, Tennessee and The Murano in Philadelphia.

The company was formed on May 17, 1996.

In 2011, the company acquired the property management business of Eola Capital and its ownership stake in 6 properties for $462 million.

In 2012, the company acquired Hearst Tower for $250 million. The company also sold 15 properties in Memphis for $147.5 million.
