= 5-epiaristolochene 1,3-dihydroxylase =

Class of enzymes

Identifiers
- EC no.: 1.14.14.149

Databases
- IntEnz: IntEnz view
- BRENDA: BRENDA entry
- ExPASy: NiceZyme view
- KEGG: KEGG entry
- MetaCyc: metabolic pathway
- PRIAM: profile
- PDB structures: RCSB PDB PDBe PDBsum
Search
- PMC: articles
- PubMed: articles
- NCBI: proteins

5-epiaristolochene 1,3-dihydroxylase (EC 1.14.14.149, 5-epi-aristolochene 1,3-dihydroxylase, EAH) is an enzyme with systematic name 5-epiaristolochene,NADPH:oxygen oxidoreductase (1- and 3-hydroxylating). It catalyses the following chemical reaction:

(+)-5-epi-aristolochene
2 O_{2}
2 H_{2}O
capsidiol

5-epiaristolochene 1,3-dihydroxylase is a cytochrome P450 protein containing heme, isolated from tobacco. It uses molecular oxygen for the oxidation and requires a partner cytochrome P450 reductase for functional expression. This uses nicotinamide adenine dinucleotide phosphate.
