= Cousins Properties =

American real estate company

Cousins Properties Incorporated
- Type: Public
- Traded as: NYSE: CUZ; S&P 400 component
- Founded: 1958; 68 years ago
- Founder: Tom Cousins
- Headquarters: Atlanta, Georgia, United States
- Key people: Colin Connolly (CEO); S. Taylor Glover (chairman & CEO); Gregg D. Adzema (CFO)
- Revenue: ▲US$994 million (2025)
- Net income: ▼US$40.5 million (2025)
- Total assets: ▲US$8.89 billion (2025)
- Total equity: ▼US$4.68 billion (2025)
- Number of employees: 306 (2024)
- Website: cousins.com

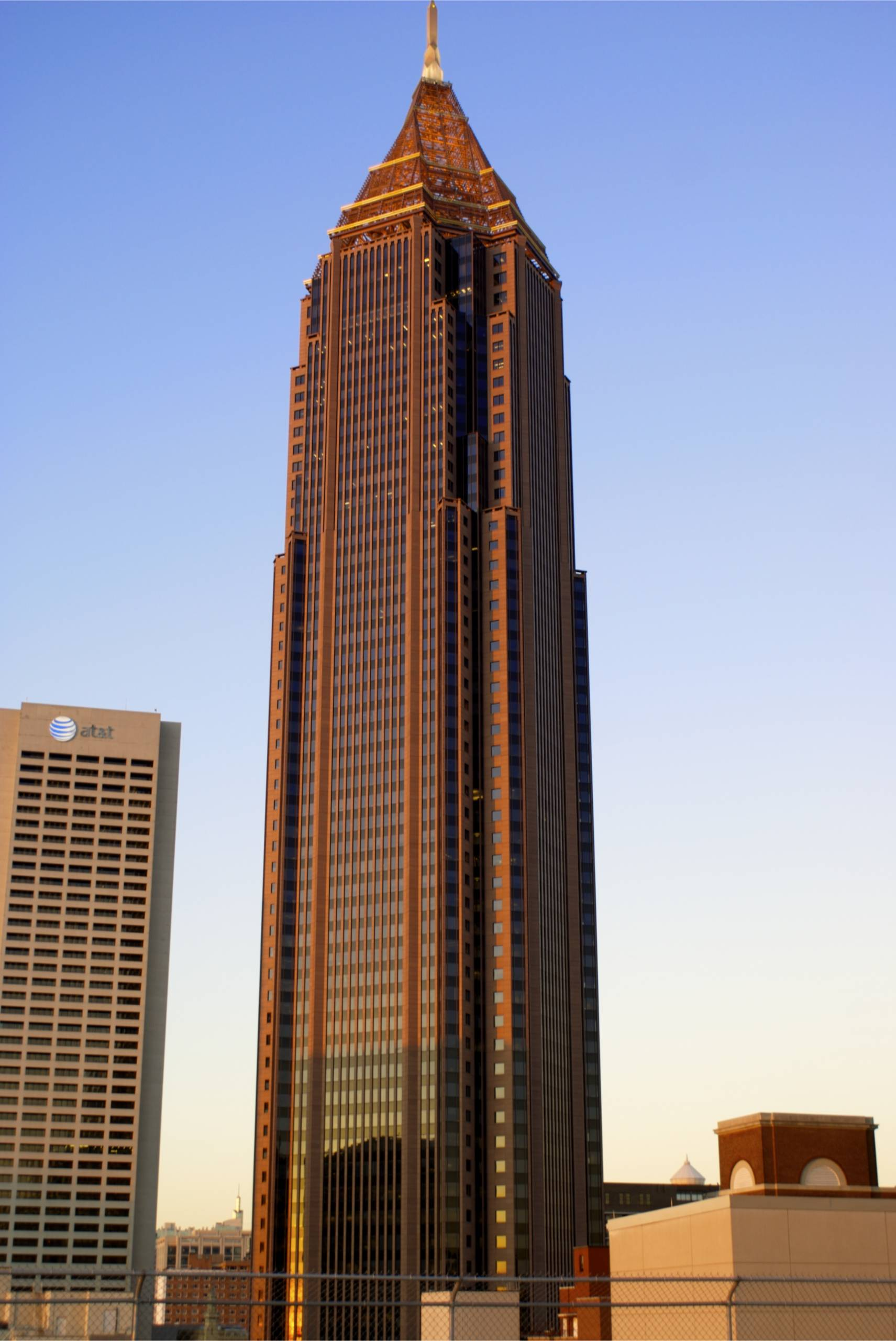
The Bank of America tower in Atlanta was developed by Cousins Properties and sold in 2006 for $436 million. In 2012, it sold at foreclosure for $235 million

Cousins Properties Incorporated is an American publicly traded real estate investment trust (REIT) that invests in office buildings in Atlanta, Charlotte, Austin, Phoenix, Tampa, and Chapel Hill, North Carolina. The company has developed notable properties including CNN Center, Omni Coliseum, 191 Peachtree Tower, and Emory Point in Atlanta.

As of December 31, 2024, the company owned wholly or through joint ventures 42 properties comprising 20.6 million square feet of office space and 467,000 square feet of other space.

== History ==
The company was founded in 1958 by Tom Cousins.

In 1962, the company became a public company via an initial public offering.

In 1965, the company built an office building in downtown Atlanta.

In the 1970s, the company expanded into regional malls, real estate finance, and insurance but pared back after the economy softened.

In 1987, Tom Cousins formed the Cousins Foundation and funded it with stock in the company.

In 2002, Thomas Cousins retired from his position as CEO, but remained chairman of the board of directors until the end of 2006, at which time he retired. R. Dary Stone also stepped down from the president and COO positions in 2002.

In 2004, the company partnered with Jim Wilson and Associates, Inc. to develop The Avenue at Carriage Crossing.

In 2016, the company acquired Parkway Properties and spun off its Houston assets into Parkway, Inc.
