= EAH Housing =

US nonprofit corporation

EAH Housing is a nonprofit corporation which develops, manages, and operates affordable housing for low-income families, older adults, and persons with disabilities/special needs in California and Hawaii. It was founded in 1968. The acronym used in its founding stands for Ecumenical Association for Housing, however today it does business simply as EAH Housing.

== History ==
EAH Housing has become one of the largest nonprofit housing development and management organizations in the western United States. With a staff of over 700, EAH develops low-income housing, manages over 230 properties in California and Hawaii, and plays a leadership role in local, regional and national housing advocacy efforts. Starting from grass-roots origins in response to the death of Dr. Martin Luther King Jr., EAH Housing now serves over 25,000 seniors, families, students, people with disabilities/special needs, frail elderly, and the formerly homeless.

== Sustainability efforts ==
In December 2010, EAH Housing was recognized with an honorable mention by the California Sustainability Alliance's Sustainability Showcase Awards. The honor commends EAH for their commitment to providing sustainable and affordable multifamily housing to 25,000 families, students, people with disabilities, and seniors. EAH is a member of the Better Buildings Challenge, and is committed to reducing energy intensity by 20% within ten years. EAH has 3.1 MW of on-site solar PV in their affordable housing portfolio, and is committed to an additional 20 projects – a total of nearly 10 megawatts.

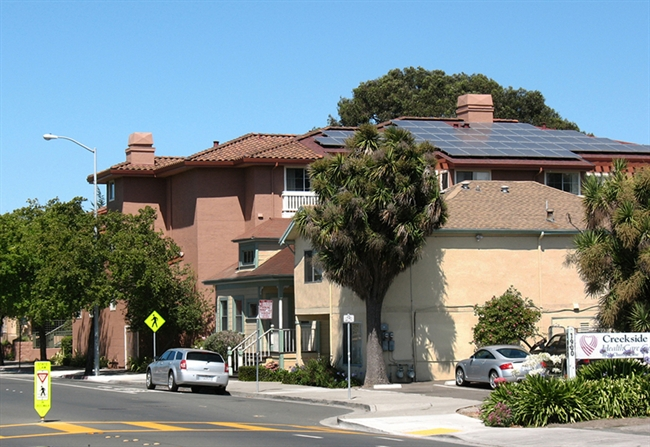
EAH Housing Casa Adobe Solar Panels

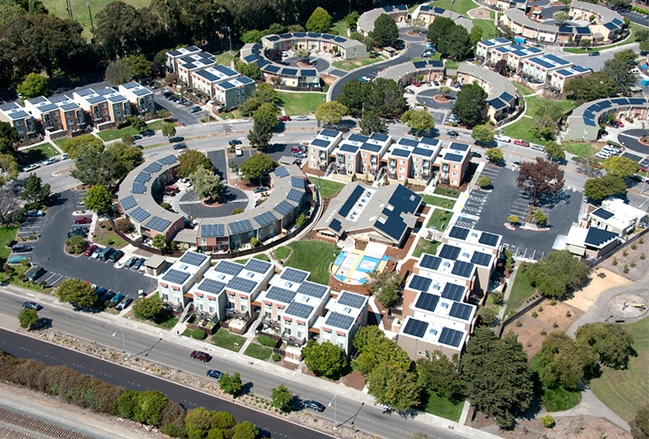
EAH Housing Crescent Park Solar Panels

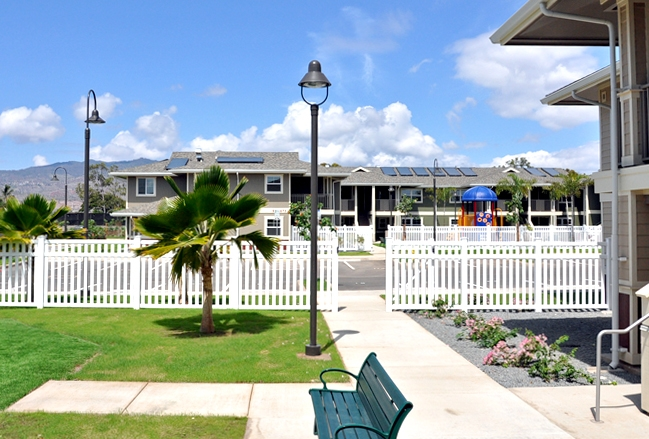
EAH Housing Villages of Moa'Eku Solar Panels

== See also ==
- California housing shortage
