= Thomas Properties Group =

Defunct real estate investment firm

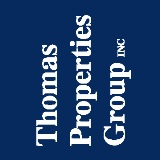
- Industry: Real estate investment trust
- Founded: 1996; 30 years ago
- Founder: James A. Thomas
- Defunct: December 20, 2013; 12 years ago
- Fate: Acquired by Parkway Properties
- Successor: Parkway Properties, Inc.
- Headquarters: Los Angeles, California, United States
- Area served: California, Pennsylvania, Virginia, and Texas
- Key people: James A. Thomas (founder, chairman, president, & CEO)

Thomas Properties Group was a real estate investment trust based in City National Plaza in Los Angeles, California.

On December 20, 2013, Thomas Properties was acquired by Parkway Properties.

== History ==
Thomas Properties Group was founded in 1996 by James A. Thomas, and incorporated on March 9, 2004.

On March 9, 2004, it became a public company via an initial public offering.

In August 2005, the company entered the Houston, Texas market with the acquisition of 2.5 million square feet of office space from EQ Office in a joint venture with CalSTRS. The joint venture was liquidated in October 2013.

On July 1, 2007, Lehman Brothers and CalSTRS partnered with Thomas Properties to buy several properties in Austin, Texas that The Blackstone Group had acquired as part of its acquisition of EQ Office.

In 2012, the company, in partnership with CalSTRs, acquired Lehman Brothers's interest in the joint venture.

On December 20, 2013, Thomas Properties Group was acquired by Parkway Properties for $1.2 billion.

== Awards ==
In 2008, the company received the California Sustainability Alliance's Sustainability Showcase Award. Thomas Properties Group was recognized for leadership in greening real estate and in integrating sustainable design and operations into all aspects of its products, services and investments.

== See also ==
- Forest City Realty Trust
