= Fresh to Order =

American restaurant chain

Fresh To Order
- Company type: Private
- Industry: Dining
- Founded: 2005; 21 years ago
- Headquarters: Alpharetta, Georgia, U.S.
- Key people: Pierre Panos (Founder/CEO); Jesse Gideon (Corporate Chef & COO)
- Products: Salads, panini sandwiches, fresh soups, entree plates, vegetarian options, gluten-free friendly, craft beers and wines.
- Website: www.freshtoorder.com

Fresh To Order (f2o) is a "Fine Fast," casual dining franchise restaurant.

== Background ==
Founded by restaurateur Pierre Panos in 2005, Fresh To Order opened its first location in 2006 and currently has fifteen locations open in Indiana, Georgia, Tennessee, and South Carolina.
