= Hines Interests Limited Partnership =

American real estate company

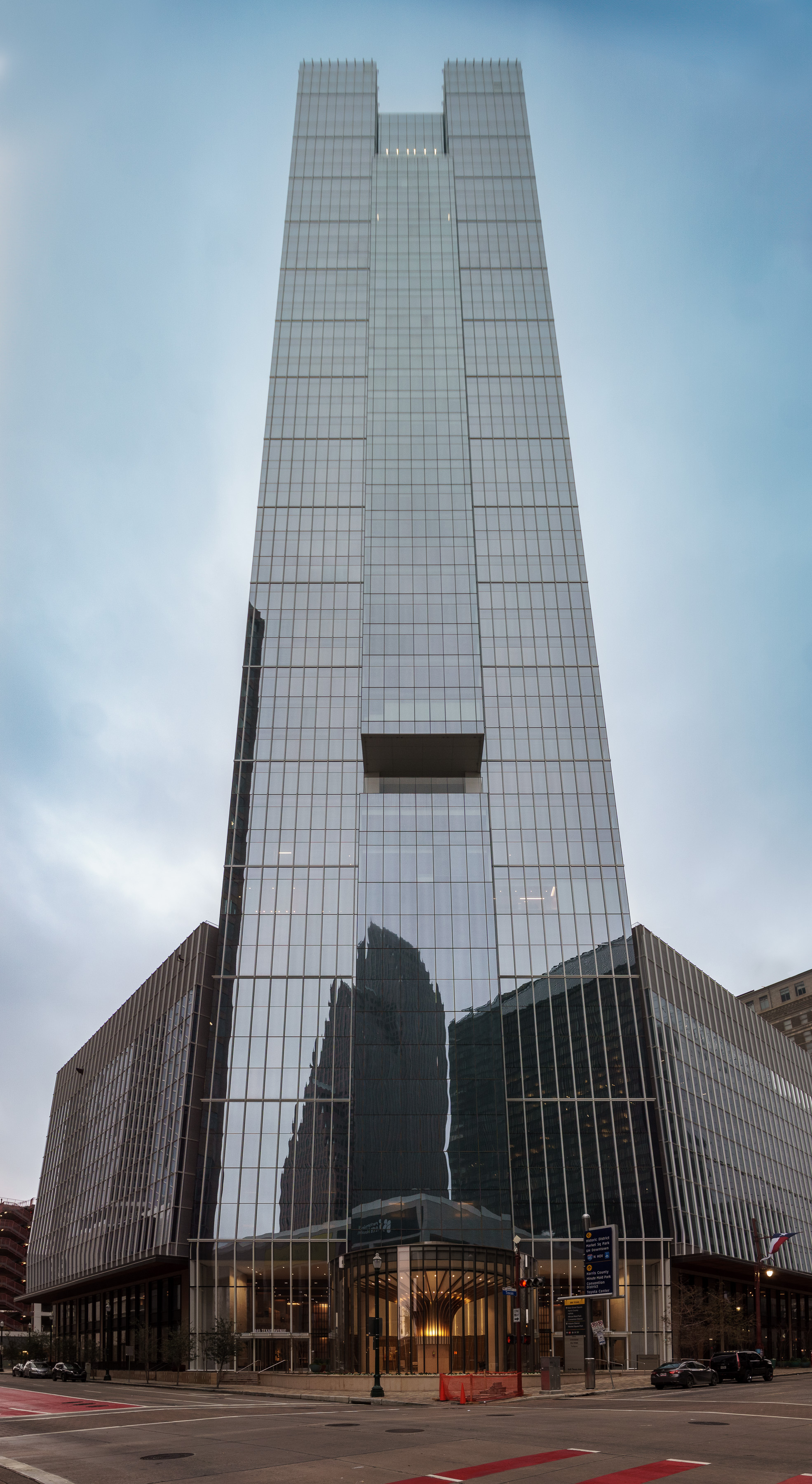
- Texas Tower, headquarters of the company
- Type: Private
- Industry: Real estate
- Founded: 1957; 69 years ago
- Founder: Gerald D. Hines
- Headquarters: Texas Tower; Houston, Texas
- Key people: Jeffrey C. Hines (chairman and co-CEO); Laura Hines-Pierce (co-CEO)
- AUM: $93.2 billion (April 2, 2024)
- Number of employees: ~5,000
- Website: hines.com

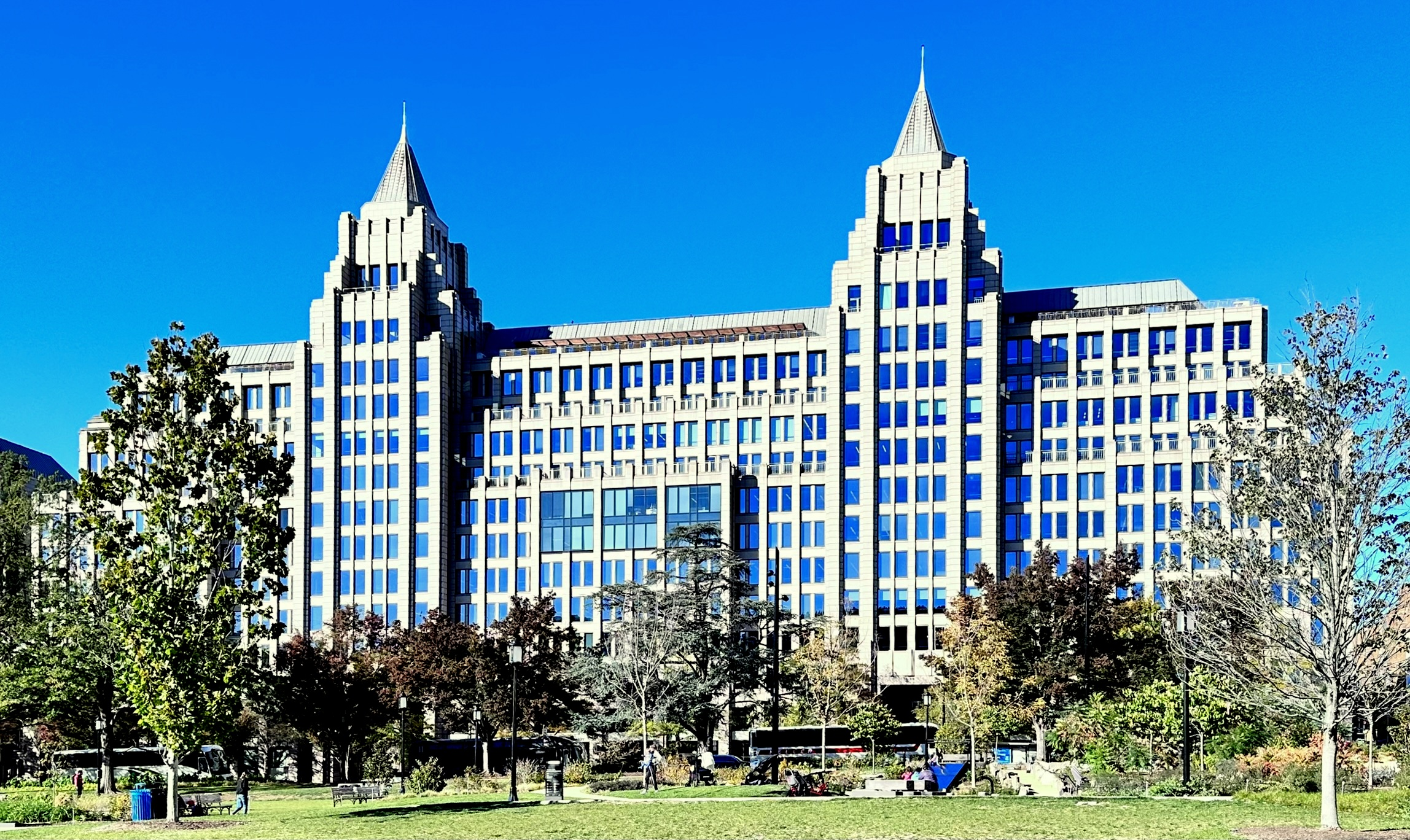
One Franklin Square, owned by the company

Hines Interests Limited Partnership is an American privately held company that invests in and develops real estate.

As of 2023, the company has developed, redeveloped or acquired more than 1,600 properties, comprising over 540 million square feet. The company manages 685 properties comprising 216 million square feet, and had a presence in 30 countries. As of 2024, the company holds $93.2 billion worth of assets under management.

== History ==
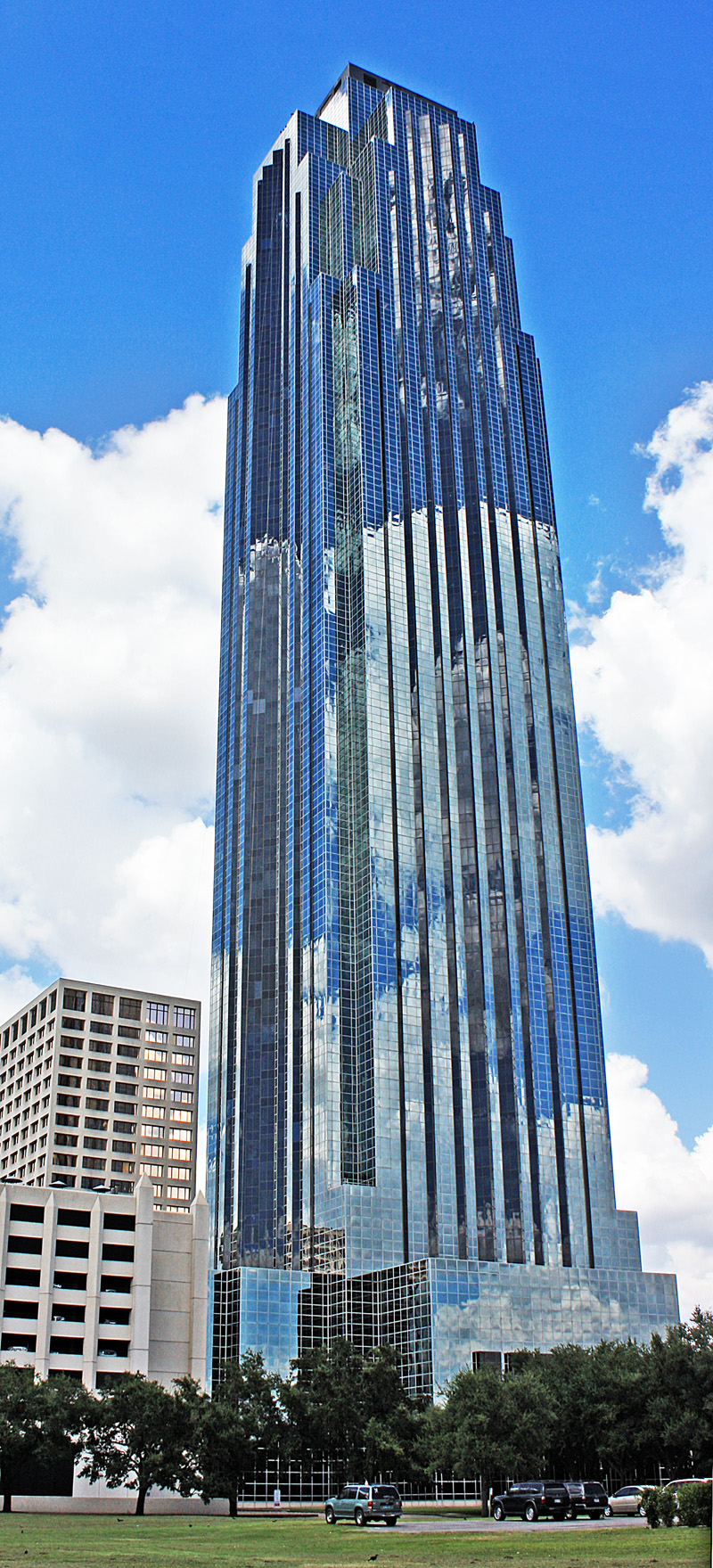
Williams Tower, former headquarters of the company

The company “Hines” (first named Gerald D. Hines Interests) was founded in Houston in 1957 by Gerald D. Hines, an American real estate developer with a background in mechanical engineering. The company initially began as a side-business to an engineering partnership after Gerald D. Hines moved to Houston for work in 1948.

=== Pre-2000 ===
Between 1957 and 1967, the firm developed approximately 69 new office or warehouse buildings, along with retail and residential projects. The company's first large-scale commercial development came in 1967 when Shell Oil Company hired Hines to construct a new downtown Houston headquarters. The project, One Shell Plaza, would open in 1971. The Galleria, Pennzoil Place, Williams Tower, and more than 900 developments would follow. The company also developed the Texas Commerce Tower, now JPMorgan Chase Tower, a 75-story skyscraper that is the tallest building in Texas, which opened in 1982. The firm proceeded to branch out into Europe in 1989. It consequently completed projects in Spain, Italy, Germany, and the United Kingdom.

In 1990, Gerald's son Jeffrey became president and the company expanded into global markets. In the 1990s, Hines had developed its own standards for indoor air quality, which influenced rules later established by the United States Environmental Protection Agency.

=== Early 2000s ===
In 2003, Hines established a real estate fund, known as the Hines Real Estate Investment Trust (Hines REIT). A 2005 report by the Lipsey Company, recognized Hines as one of the largest real estate firms in the world, with operations throughout the U.S. and across the globe. Many of the firm's buildings were designed by well-known architects, including I. M. Pei, Cesar Pelli, Frank Gehry, and Robert A.M. Stern. In 2006, the company assisted in the development of LEED standards.

=== 2010s ===
The company would work on notable projects through the 2010s, such as the CityCenterDC on the site of the former convention center in Washington D.C. in April 2011, and the Walter Reed Army Medical Center as a team led by the company was chosen as the master developer in November 2013.

From 2013 to 2016, Hines led a speculative development called “Timber, Transit & Technology” (T3). At the end of 2016, Hines completed the construction of T3, a 7-story, 224,000 square-foot office building consisting mainly of heavy timber, harvested from managed forests to maximize sustainability. The project was said to be the first modern wooden office building of its size in the United States.

In June 2019 Hines partnered with the Abu Dhabi Investment Authority (ADIA) to fund Conscient Infra's construction of an apartment complex: Conscient Hines Elevate, in Gurgaon for INR 400 crore.

In December 2019, The Boston Globe reported that Hines would be developing the South Station Tower in Boston, totaling 678 feet in height through 51 stories.

=== 2020s ===
Founder Gerald Hines died on August 23, 2020, just days after his 95th birthday. Jeffrey Hines took on his father's role of chairman while also retaining his position as chief executive officer. The company continued on, forming a joint venture with the National Pension Service of Korea to focus on build-to-core properties in the U.S. in December 2020. In 2021, Hines opened the first of two towers at the CIBC Square in Toronto. The project is co-developed with Ivanhoé Cambridge and encompasses 3 million square feet.

After 40 years of its headquarters being located in Williams Tower, the company moved its headquarters to the Texas Tower in late 2021. The new building comprises 1 million square feet across 47 floors. In 2022, Jeffrey Hines’ daughter Laura Hines-Pierce became co-CEO of the company alongside her father.

In May 2022, Hines topped out the Salesforce Tower in Chicago, standing at 57 stories.

In July 2024, Pinellas County commissioners approved a deal with the Tampa Bay Rays and Hines, who sought to develop 65 acres of land within the Historic Gas Plant District, and to build Gas Plant Stadium, a new $1.3 billion baseball stadium replacing Tropicana Field as the Rays home arena. The deal includes a $50 million commitment from the Rays and Hines toward at least 5,000 residential units (including affordable and workforce housing), small business assistance, job creation and educational programs, plus $10 million for a new museum for the Dr. Carter G. Woodson African American Museum. The total cost of the projects is estimated at $6.5 billion in public and private investment.

In November 2024, the company drew negative publicity for its 'Black Friday Deal,' where rental apartments were listed in Dublin at over €2000, and was seen as indicative of the company's complicity in Ireland's housing crisis, where over 4000 children are currently homeless.

== Funds ==
In Asia, Hines has one active fund, Hines Asia Property Partners (HAPP, a real estate fund focused on Asia launched in May 2021).

In Europe, Hines has three active funds, the Hines European Core Fund (HECF, an open-end diversified fund launched in 2006), Hines European Property Partners (HEPP, an open-end diversified core-plus fund launched in 2022) and the Hines European Real Estate Partners 3 (HEREP 3, a real estate fund focused in Europe launched in January 2022). The HEREP 3 received commitments from 35 investors in addition to Hines’ own co-investment.

In North America, Hines has two active funds, the Hines U.S. Property Partners (HUSPP, a diversified core-plus fund) and the Hines U.S. Property Recovery Fund (HUSPRF, a real estate fund focusing on renovating struggling or undervalued properties in the United States launched in January 2022).

Hines Global Income Trust is an investment trust founded in 2014 that focuses on investing in commercial properties within North America. The trust’s portfolio is worth $3.9 billion as of January 2024.

=== Transactions ===
List of transactions
Location	Description	Cost	Partner	Date	Source
Chicago, 321 N. Clark	897,000 square foot office building	Acquired, $247.3 million	N/A	March 2006	
Redmond, Washington	portfolio of 9 buildings	Acquired, $217 million	Subsidiary	December 2006	
N/A	70% interest in 12 shopping centers owned by Weingarten Realty Investors	N/A	N/A	November 2008	
San Francisco	542,000 square foot office building	Surrendered	Sterling	July 2009	
Minneapolis	Office tower	Acquired, $180 million	N/A	October 2010	
Seattle, Washington	9 buildings, including Safeco Plaza (Seattle)	Sold 2% interest to joint venture partner CalPERS, price N/A	N/A	December 2010	
San Francisco	Headquarters of Old Navy	Acquired, $180 million	Subsidiary	August 2012	
Washington D.C.	Building	Sold to Liberty Property Trust, $133.5 million	N/A	May 2013	
Pasco county, Florida	Behnke Ranch	Acquired, price N/A	N/A	November 2013	
Washington D.C.	Property	Acquired, $141.9 million	N/A	December 2013	
North Bethesda, Maryland	345,000 square foot office complex	Acquired from JBG Smith, price N/A	N/A	February 2016	
Midtown Manhattan	Site, development of 15-story senior living facility	Acquired, price N/A	Welltower	April 2016	
South Florida	Property	Sold, $27.59 million	Subsidiary	August 2016	
West Coast of the United States	7 office properties	Sold to an affiliate of The Blackstone Group, $1.162 billion	N/A	November 2016	
Bellevue, Washington	Office property	Sold to an affiliate of AEW Capital Management, $193 million	N/A	November 2016	
Sacramento	Wells Fargo Center (Sacramento)	Sold to Starwood Capital Group, $175.5 million	N/A	November 2016	
East Bay (San Francisco Bay Area)	Property	Acquired, $108.9 million	Oaktree Capital Management	March 2017	
La Porte, Texas	2.2 million square foot distribution center	Acquired from BlackRock, Price N/A	N/A	March 2017	
Miami	Apartment complex	Sold, $100 million	N/A	July 2017	
Athens, Greece	71,000 square meter site to be developed into a residential-for-sale complex	Acquired, price N/A	Henderson Park Capital	August 2020	
Utah	Utah Pantages Theatre, to be converted to a 31 story apartment building	Acquired, $0, with an agreement to include affordable housing	N/A	November 2021	

== See also ==
- Gerald D. Hines Waterwall Park
