= Gerald D. Hines =

American businessman (1925–2020)

- Born: August 15, 1925; Gary, Indiana, U.S.
- Died: August 23, 2020 (aged 95); Greenwich, Connecticut, U.S.
- Education: Purdue University (BSME)
- Occupation: Real estate developer
- Known for: Founder and chairman of Hines
- Spouses: Dorothy Schwarz; Barbara Fritzsche
- Children: 4

Gerald Douglas Hines (August 15, 1925 – August 23, 2020) was an American real estate developer based in Houston. He was the founder and chairman of Hines, a privately held real estate firm with its headquarters in that city. At the time of his death, the company had assets in 25 countries.

== Early life and education ==
Hines was born in Gary, Indiana, on August 15, 1925, to Gordon and Myrte (née McConnell) Hines. His parents had moved to Gary from Nova Scotia in 1923. Hines was descended from British loyalists who fought in the Revolutionary War. Following his service as a lieutenant in the U.S. Army Corps of Engineers from 1943 to 1946, he graduated with a degree in mechanical engineering from Purdue University in 1948. He was then employed by American Blower Corp, and was subsequently transferred to Houston. After working at the company for several years, he went to work for Texas Engineering.

== Career ==
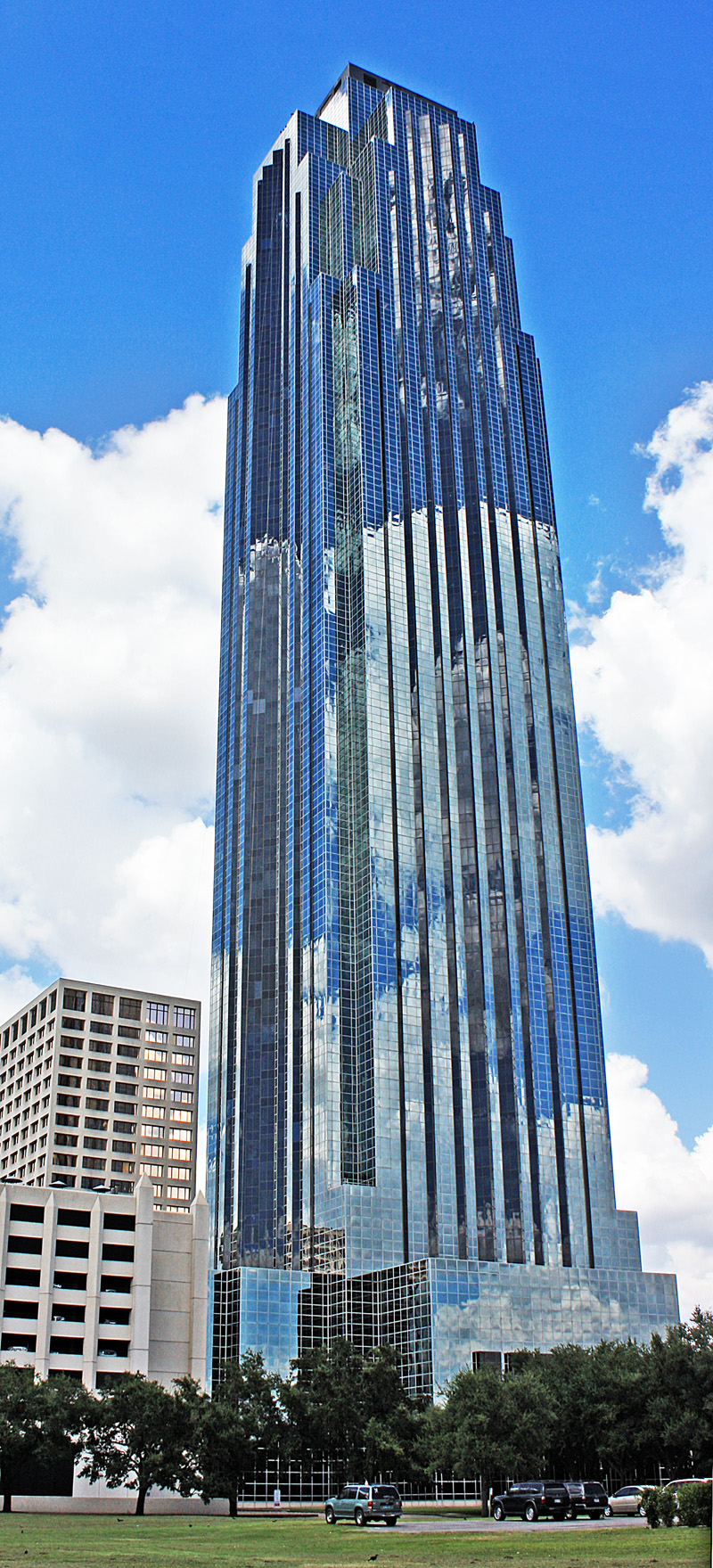
Williams Tower in Houston

Shortly after moving to Houston in 1948, Hines formed an engineering partnership and started a fledgling real estate business on the side. He established Gerald D. Hines Interests in 1957; its early projects included warehouses and small office buildings. Edgar L. Muller was his architectural engineer in the early years in an office Hines built on Richmond Avenue. His first large-scale commercial development came in 1967 when Shell Oil Company hired Hines to construct a new downtown Houston headquarters. The Galleria, Pennzoil Place, Transco Tower (now Williams Tower), and more than 900 developments would follow. The firm proceeded to branch out into Europe after the fall of communism there in 1989. It consequently completed projects in Spain, Italy, Germany, and the United Kingdom. Hines also served as chairman of the Federal Reserve Bank of Dallas from 1981 to 1983.

Hines was elected a member of the National Academy of Engineering in 2001 for global leadership in engineering advancements that set the standard for innovative and efficient design in the commercial building industry.

Hines subsequently passed control of the company to his son Jeffrey in 1990. A 2005 report by the Lipsey Company, recognized Hines as one of the largest real estate firms in the world, with operations throughout the U.S. and across the globe. Many of the firm's buildings were designed by well-known architects, including I. M. Pei, Philip Johnson, Cesar Pelli, Frank Gehry, and Robert A.M. Stern.

At the time of his death, the Hines portfolio of projects underway, completed, acquired, and managed for third parties includes more than 1,900 properties representing approximately 679,000,000 square feet (63,100,000 m^{2}) of office, living/housing, mixed-use, industrial/logistics, hospitality, medical, retail, and sports facilities, as well as large, master-planned communities and land developments. With controlled assets valued at approximately $144.1 billion, Hines is one of the largest real estate organizations in the world. As of 2016, his net worth equaled US$1.3 billion.

== Philanthropy ==
Hines donated $7 million to the University of Houston's College of Architecture, which renamed the college the Gerald D. Hines College of Architecture. He was one of the primary contributors in the construction of the Chabad Jewish Community Center in Aspen, Colorado.

== Personal life ==
In 1952, he married Dorothy Schwarz (died 2017) of the Schwarz family, founders of F.A.O. Schwarz toys; they have two children: Jeff and Jennifer, and divorced in 1980.

In his early 50s, Hines was told by doctors that he needed heart bypass surgery. Instead he became a vegetarian and followed a vigorous exercise routine. He helped to fund studies conducted by Dean Ornish. In 1981, he married German-born painter Barbara Fritzsche, who had grown up in Australia, the daughter of Holocaust survivors. Together they had two children: Serena and Trevor.

Hines died on August 23, 2020, at his home in Connecticut. He had celebrated his 95th birthday just over a week before his death.

== Awards ==
- 1979: Golden Plate Award of the American Academy of Achievement
- Hines has an Urban Land Institute competition and award named in his honor: the ULI/Gerald D. Hines Student Urban Design Competition.
- 2000: Honor Award from the National Building Museum
- 2002 Urban Land Institute J.C. Nichols Prize for Visionary Urban Development
- 2004: The Lynn S. Beedle Lifetime Achievement Award from the Council on Tall Buildings and Urban Habitat
- 2008: the first Visionary Leadership in Real Estate Development Award, a lifetime achievement award from Harvard University
- 2009: with his wife Barbara, the Guardian of the Human Spirit Award from the Holocaust Museum Houston
- 2012: honorary doctorate from the University of Houston

== See also ==
- Gerald D. Hines Waterwall Park
