= Museum of Biblical Art (Dallas) =

Coordinates: 32.8705°N 96.7771°W

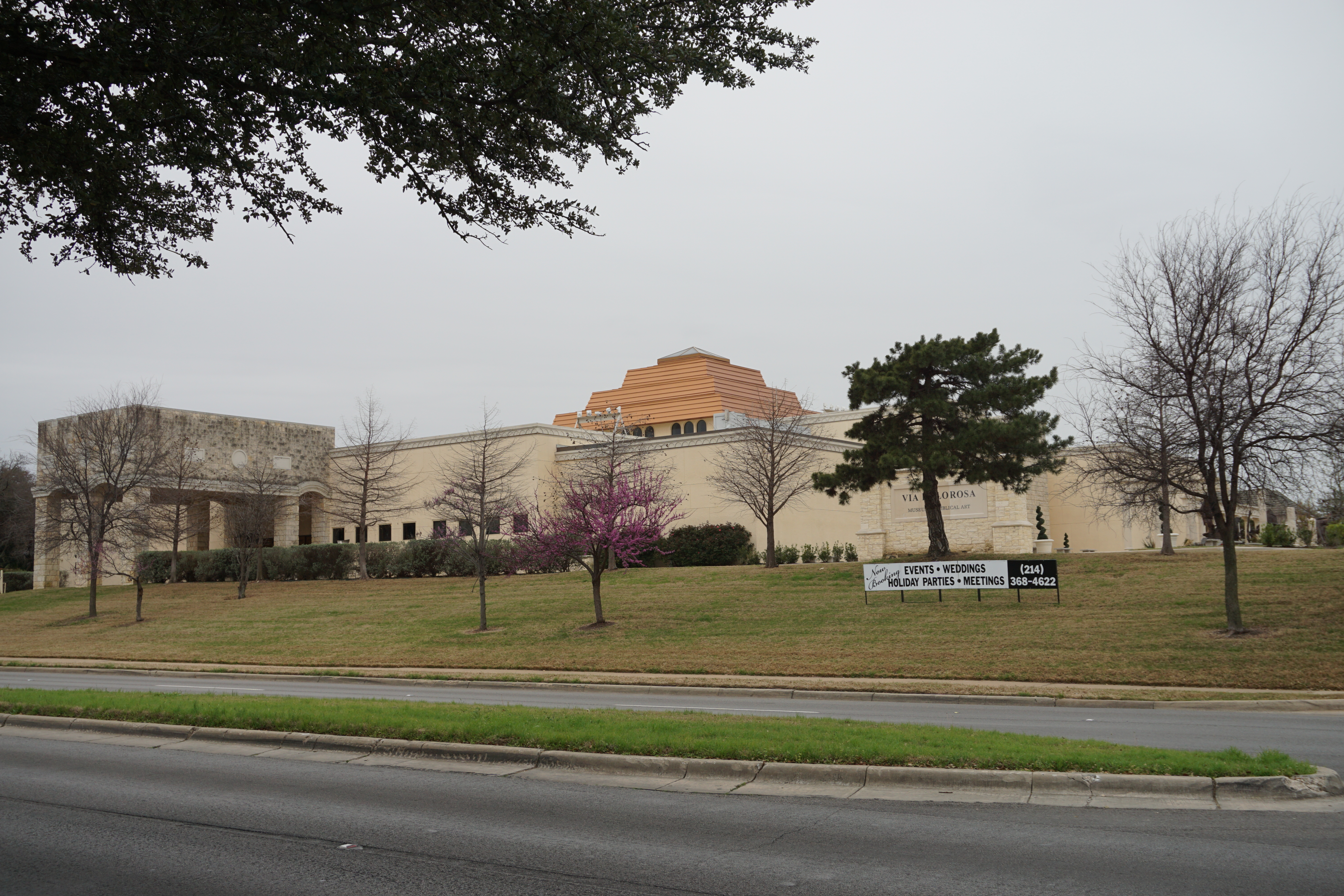
Museum of Biblical Art

The Museum of Biblical Art (MBA) in Dallas, Texas, USA, exhibits art with a Biblical theme.

== History ==
The museum was founded in 1967 by Mattie Caruth Byrd. It was formerly known as the Biblical Arts Center. In 2005, a fire destroyed the museum and 2,500 works of art. The museum rebuilt and reopened in 2010 in a modern building with eleven galleries and 30,000 square feet of exhibition and event space.

== Collection ==
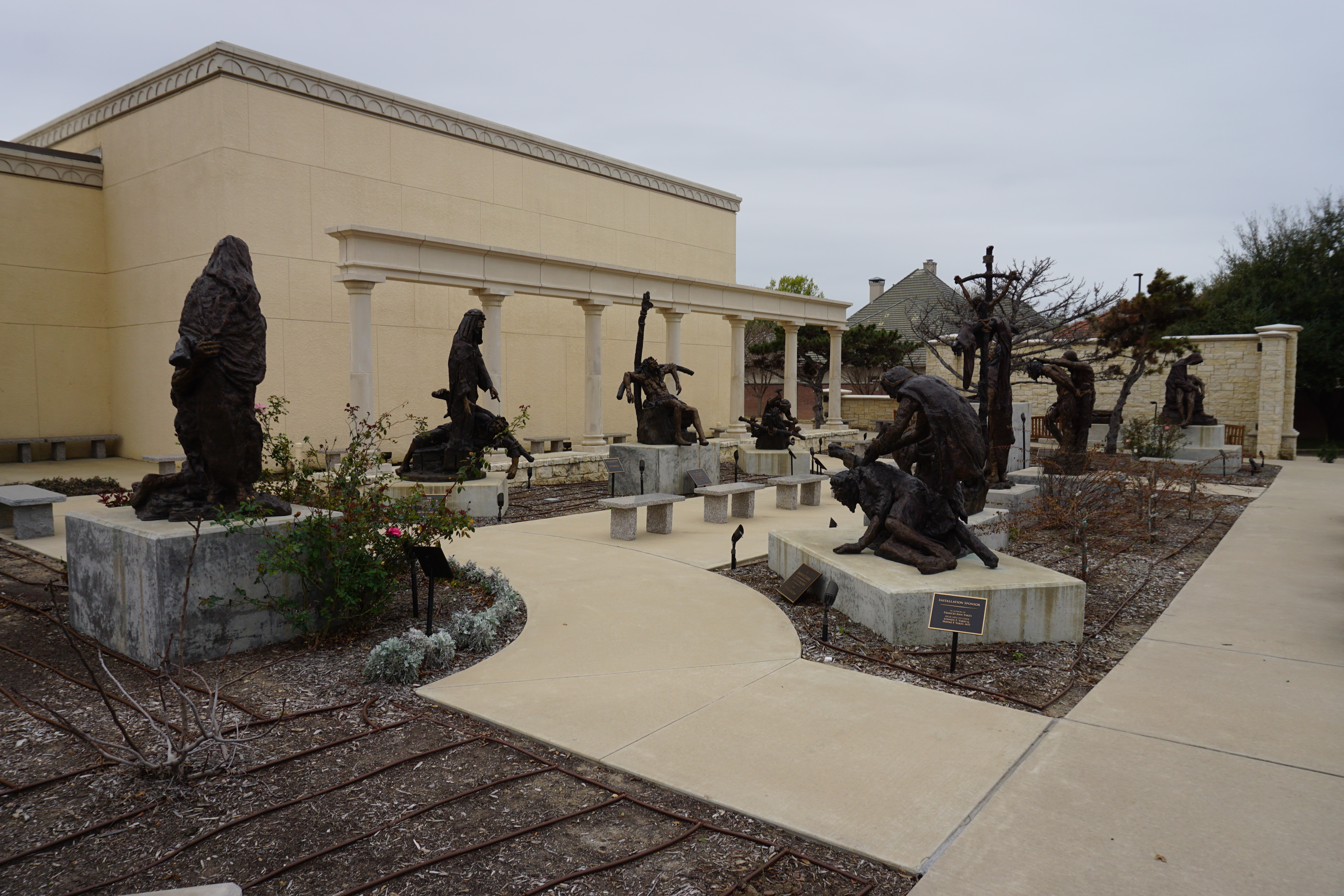
Via Dolorosa Sculpture Garden at the Museum of Biblical Art

The museum holds and displays 2,500 works by artists including John Singer Sargent, Andy Warhol, Marc Chagall, Leonard Baskin, William Gropper, Jack Levine, Jacques Lipchitz, Ben Shahn and Max Weber, Gib Singleton as well as ceremonial art and over 100 Bibles.

== National Center for Jewish Art ==
The National Center for Jewish Art was launched in October 2014, and occupies 10,000 square feet of the museum, showcasing its expanded Judaica collection. The inaugural exhibit featured the work of Barbara Hines. The museum was praised by the Texas Jewish Arts Association, but provoked some other members of the local Jewish community to voice misgivings that a museum with "clearly Christian roots" has won strong support among Jewish patrons of the arts and Jewish artists.
