= U.S. Bank Building (Chicago) =

Office skyscraper in Chicago, Illinois

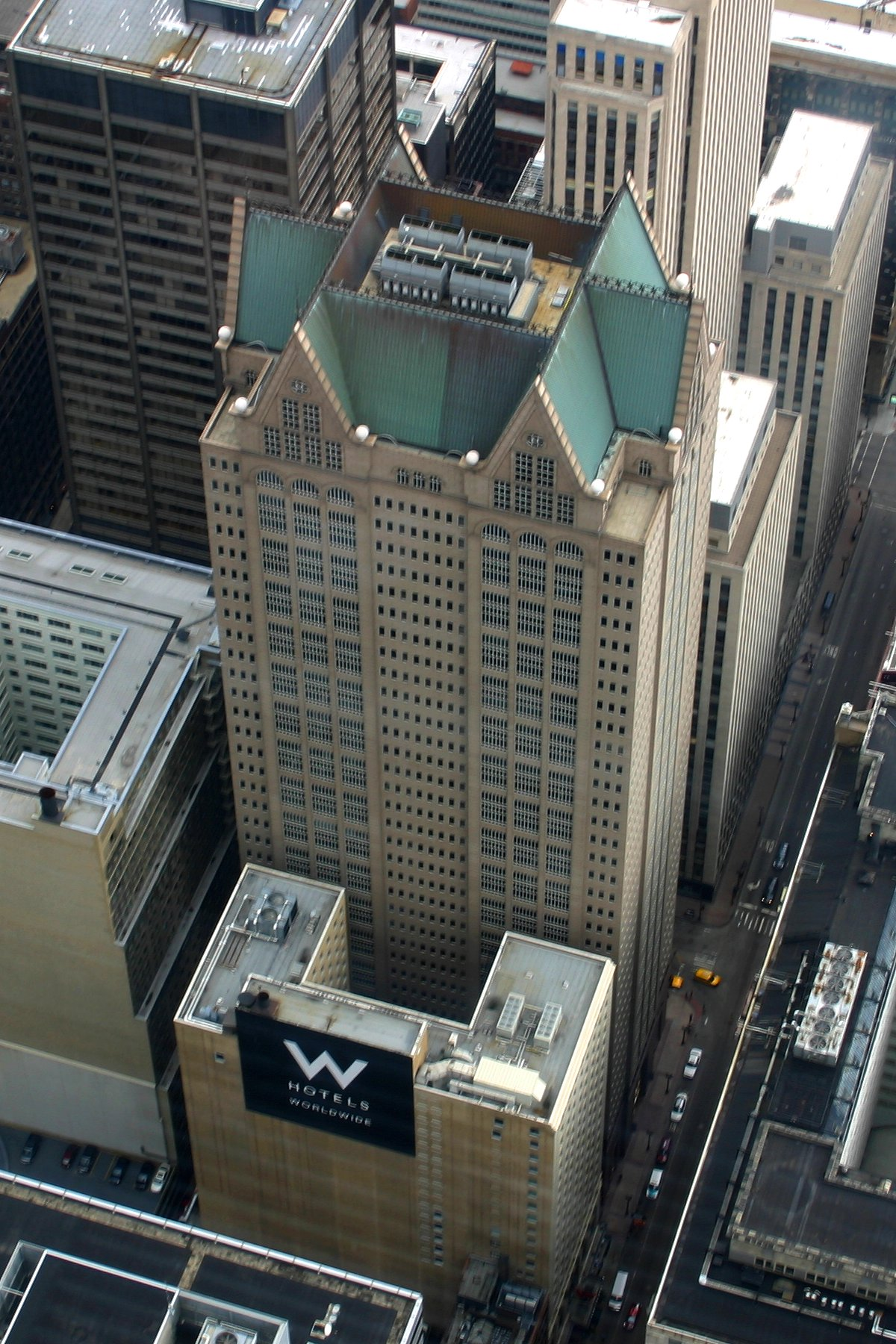
- (2011)
- Interactive map of the U.S. Bank Building area

General information
- Type: Office
- Architectural style: Postmodern
- Location: 190 South LaSalle Street, Chicago, Illinois
- Coordinates: 41.8798°N 87.6327°W
- Completed: 1987

Height
- Roof: 573 ft (175 m)

Technical details
- Floor count: 40

Design and construction
- Architect: Johnson Burgee Architects
- Developer: The John Buck Company

U.S. Bank Building, formerly 190 South LaSalle Street, is a 573 feet (175 m) tall skyscraper in Chicago, Illinois.

== History ==
It was completed in 1987 and has 40 floors. Johnson/Burgee Architects designed the building, which is the 57th tallest building in Chicago.

From 1988-2016 the lobby of the building featured a tapestry by Helena Hernmarck titled "The 1909 Plan of Chicago" depicting the Civic Center Plaza proposed in the Burnham Plan of Chicago. The tapestry is now in the collection of the Art Institute of Chicago.

In May 2013, U.S. Bank announced it agreed to increase its leased space in the structure from 66,000 square feet (6,100 m^{2}) to 110,000 square feet (10,000 m^{2}). The terms of the lease also gave the bank naming rights for the building through 2026.

== Gallery ==
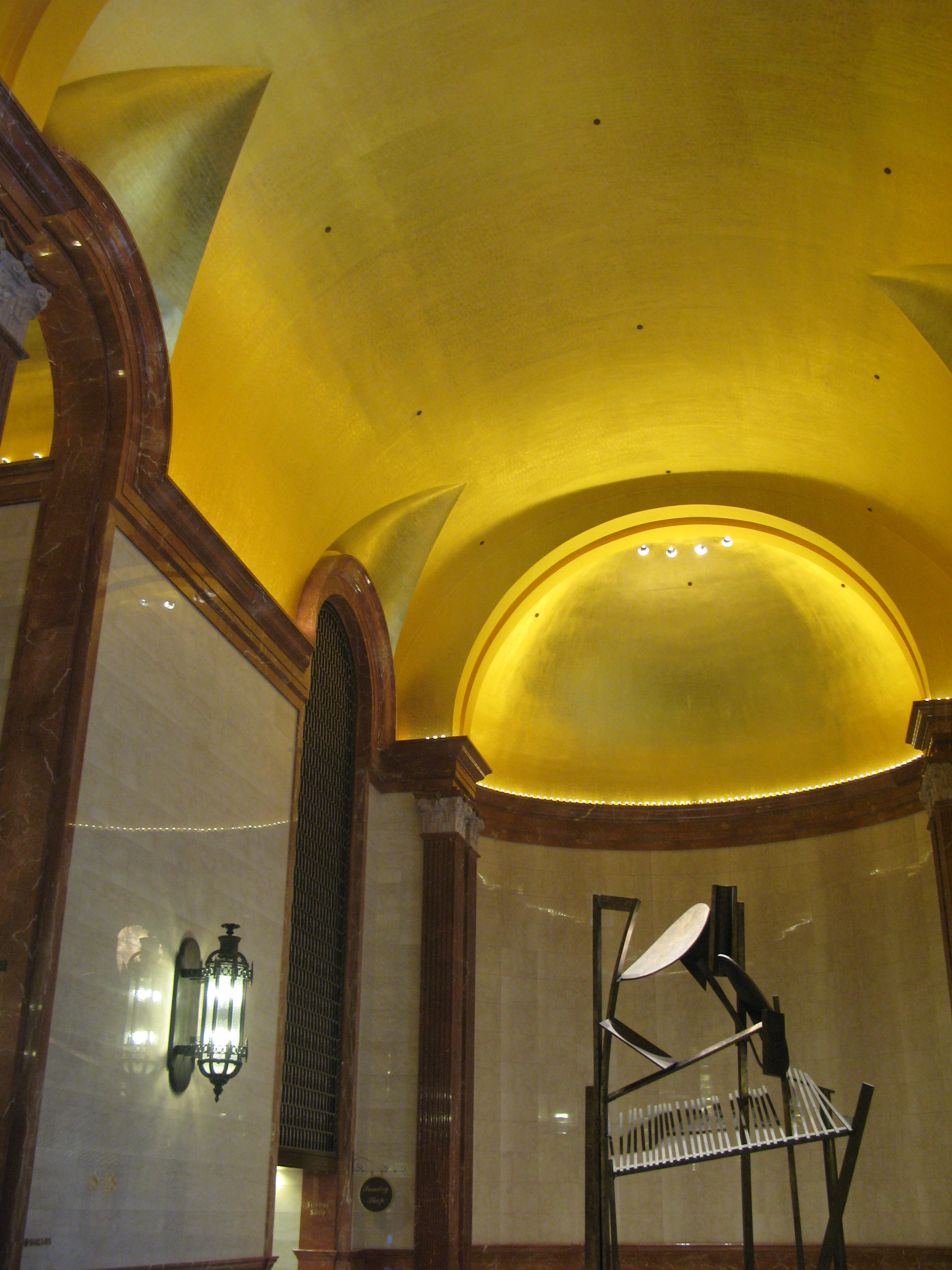
Gold leafed lobby ceiling and sculpture called Chicago Fugue

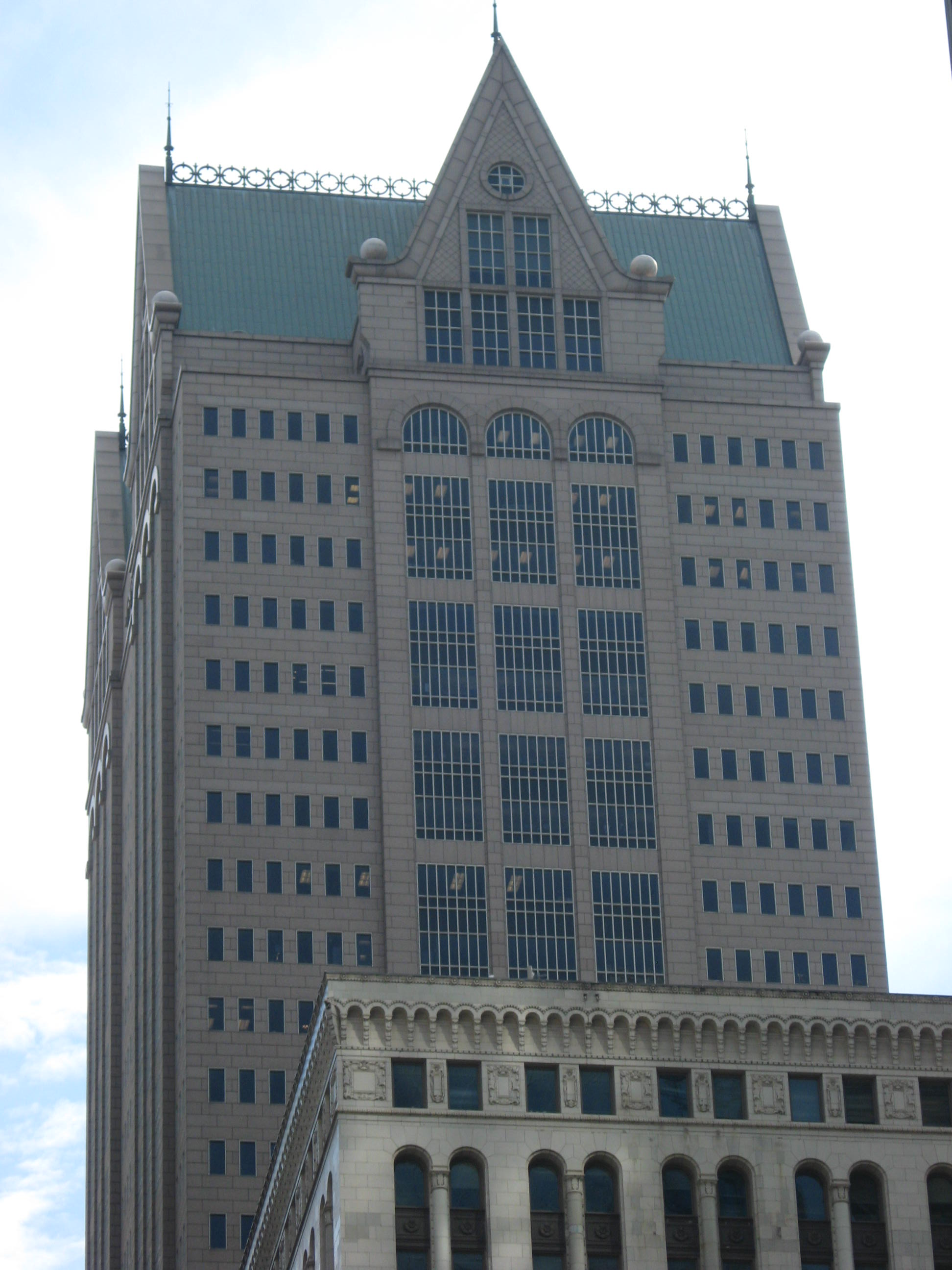
The building's gabled roof is a reference to the demolished Masonic Temple Building

== See also ==
- List of tallest buildings in Chicago
