= Barbara Hines =

American artist

Barbara Hines (born 1950) is an American artist.

== Biography ==
Hines was born Barbara Fritzsche in Germany, the daughter of Holocaust survivors. Her father served in the Luftwaffe but was imprisoned after they found out that his mother was Jewish; he later escaped and moved to West Germany where he married and had two children. The family then moved to Australia and her parents never again mentioned their Jewish ancestry to their children who were raised as Methodists. She had a dual degree in education and interior design and began her career as a high school teacher of French and English in Düsseldorf. She then moved to New York City to study interior design at the New York School of Interior Design and then enrolled in the Pratt Institute Environmental Design program. She also volunteered at the Museum of Modern Art where she was influenced by the works of Color Field painters Helen Frankenthaler and Gerhard Richter.

Hines is known for combining "impressionist treatment with contemporary style". Her first gallery show was in 2009, at Houston's Meredith Long & Company gallery. The gallery continues to represent her. In 2015 she had a solo show at the Museum of Biblical Art in Dallas. She is a supporter of Jewish causes including the Aishel House in Houston, an Orthodox Jewish organization that works with hospitals; the Holocaust Museum Houston; and organizations devoted to Orthodox Jewish education.

Hines serves as a member of the Advisory Board of Governors of the Rohr Jewish Learning Institute, JLI, the adult education arm of the Chabad Lubavitch movement and is a significant contributor to their educational initiatives across the globe.

== Personal life ==
In 1981, Hines married real estate developer Gerald D. Hines. In her 20s, she became a Buddhist and later, after her mother revealed to her that she was also Jewish, she became more involved with Judaism. Her spiritual journey began with Chabad in Aspen where she is a major benefactor, and serves on its board of directors. She is a member of Chabad in Aspen and Houston.

Barbara and Gerry Hines also support the University of Texas MD Anderson Cancer Center and the Museum of Fine Arts, Houston.

Following her husband's death, she remarried Natan Ophir, another artist, and the couple lives in Jerusalem.
