= Gerald D. Hines Waterwall Park =

Public fountain in Houston, Texas, United States

Coordinates: 29°44′9″N 95°27′40″W

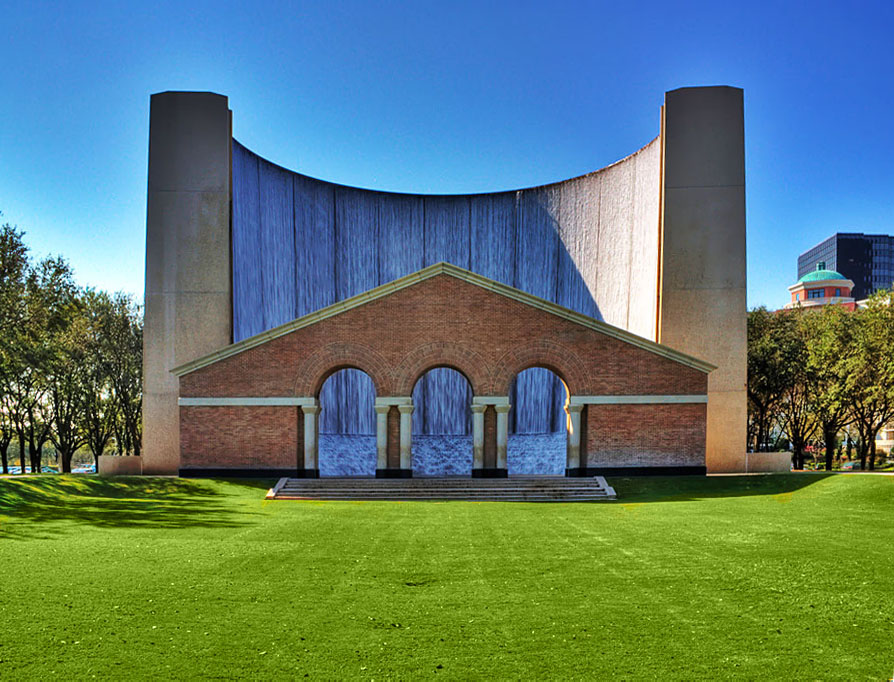
The Waterfall

The Gerald D. Hines Waterwall Park, formerly the Williams Waterwall and the Transco Waterwall, is a multi-story sculptural fountain that sits opposite the south face of Williams Tower in the Uptown District of Houston. The fountain and its surrounding park were built as an architectural amenity to the adjacent tower. Both the fountain and tower were designed by John Burgee Architects with Philip Johnson. Originally privately owned in common with the office tower, the waterwall and the surrounding land were purchased by the Uptown Houston Tax Increment Reinvestment Zone, a non-profit local government corporation, in 2008 to ensure the long-term preservation of the waterwall and park. The fountain currently operates between 10 am and 9 pm.

== Construction ==
John Burgee Architects and Philip Johnson, in coordination with developer Gerald D. Hines, began working on the Transco Tower complex in 1982, and completed construction of the office tower 18 months later in 1983. The Waterwall was fully and regularly operational in 1985.

Construction and maintenance cost figures were never released, but at the time of completion, Johnson and Hines made public vital statistics about the wall, including measurements and water volume.

== Description ==
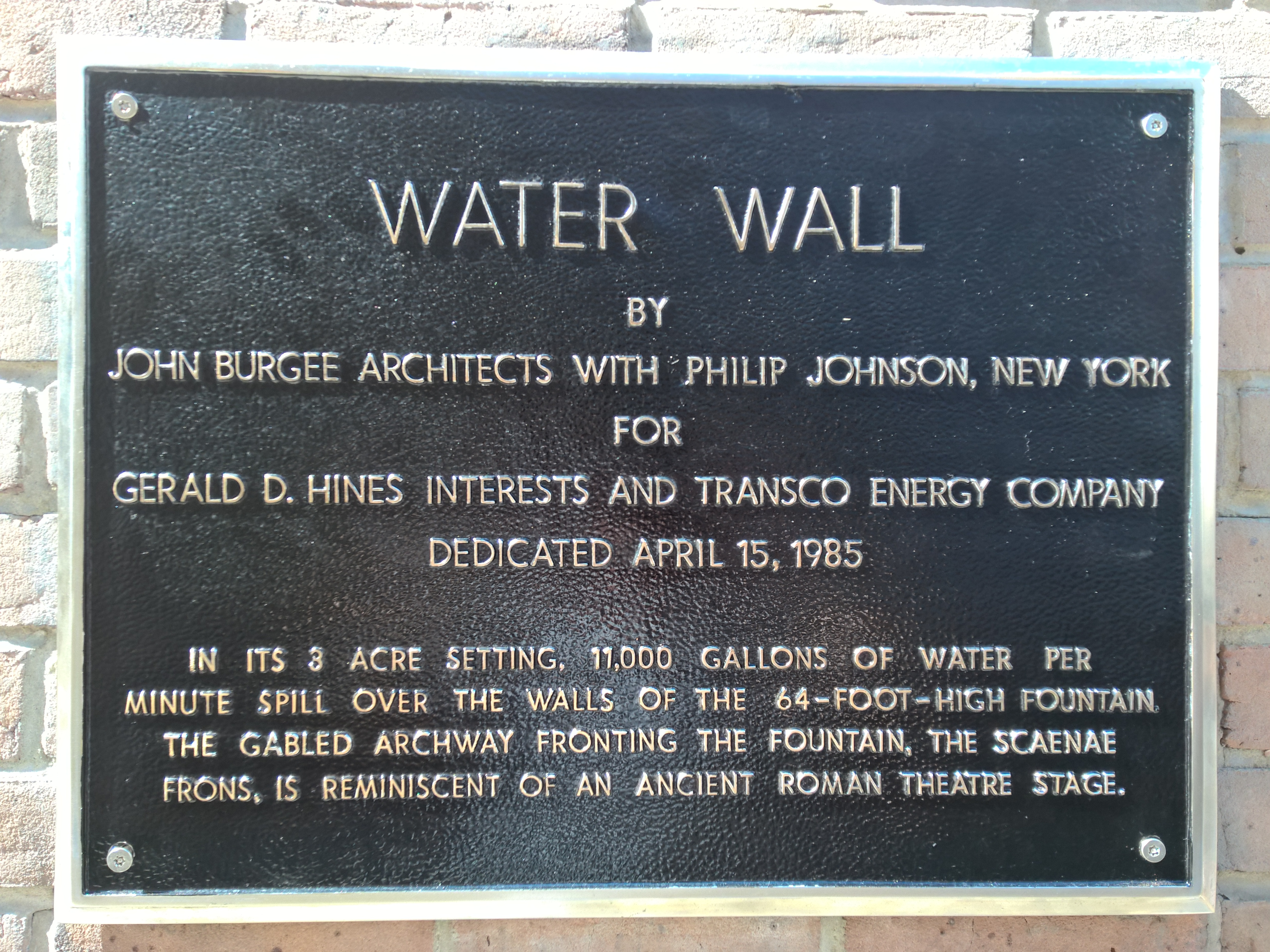
Plaque describing the Water Wall.

The architects' design for the Waterwall was to be a "horseshoe of rushing water" opposite the Transco (now Williams) Tower. The semi-circular fountain is 64 feet (20 m) tall, to symbolize the 64 stories of the tower, and sits among 118 Texas live oak trees. The concave portion of the circle, which faces north toward the tower, is fronted by a "proscenium arch" shorter than the fountain itself. The convex portion, its backside, faces south onto Hidalgo Street.

Water cascades in vast channeled sheets from the narrower top rim of the circle to the wider base below, both on the concave side and on the convex side. This creates a visually striking urban waterfall that can be viewed from various buildings around the district.

46,500 square feet (4,320 m^{2}) of water cover the interior, while 35,000 square feet (3,300 m^{2}) cover the exterior. The main building material of the fountain is St. Joe brick. However, the Romanesque arches are made of Indiana Buss limestone, while the wall's base is black granite. The entire fountain's water supply, consisting of 78,500 gallons is recycled by an internal mechanism every three hours and two minutes.

== Renaming ==
Originally the "Transco Waterwall", the waterwall was renamed the "Williams Waterfall" to correspond with the renaming of the adjacent office tower due to the merger of Transco Energy Co. with the Williams Companies. The City of Houston renamed the site again on December 17, 2009, honoring Gerald D. Hines for his influence on Houston architecture during the prior six decades.
