= Gib Singleton =

American sculptor

- Born: Gilbert Jerome Singleton; 1935; Kennett, Missouri, United States
- Died: February 28, 2014 (aged 78–79); Santa Fe, New Mexico, U.S.
- Education: Southern Illinois University Edwardsville
- Occupation: Sculptor

Gilbert Jerome "Gib" Singleton (1935 – February 28, 2014) was an American sculptor. Classically trained, he is considered to be a modern master of bronze sculpture. His primary sources of subject matter are the Bible and the American Old West.

== Biography ==
Born Gilbert Singleton in Kennett, Missouri in 1936, he began developing his artistic abilities at an early age, using whatever materials were available to a young farm boy. He won his first art prize at the age of nine, taking a blue ribbon at the Dunklin County Fair. At age 16, he became interested in bronze and built his own foundry, using a cut down steel 55 gallon drum, a discarded vacuum cleaner, and trial and error.

After graduating from high school, Singleton enlisted in the army. He then worked his way through college at Southern Illinois University Edwardsville (SIUE), graduating in 1967 with a Bachelor of Arts in art education. Upon graduating from SIUE, he won a full scholarship to the Art Institute of Chicago where his work earned him a Fulbright Scholarship. He used this to study the works of the Renaissance art masters at the Accademia di Belle Arti in Florence, Italy. While there, Jacqueline Kennedy Onassis requested that he assist with the restoration of flood damaged art in Florence.

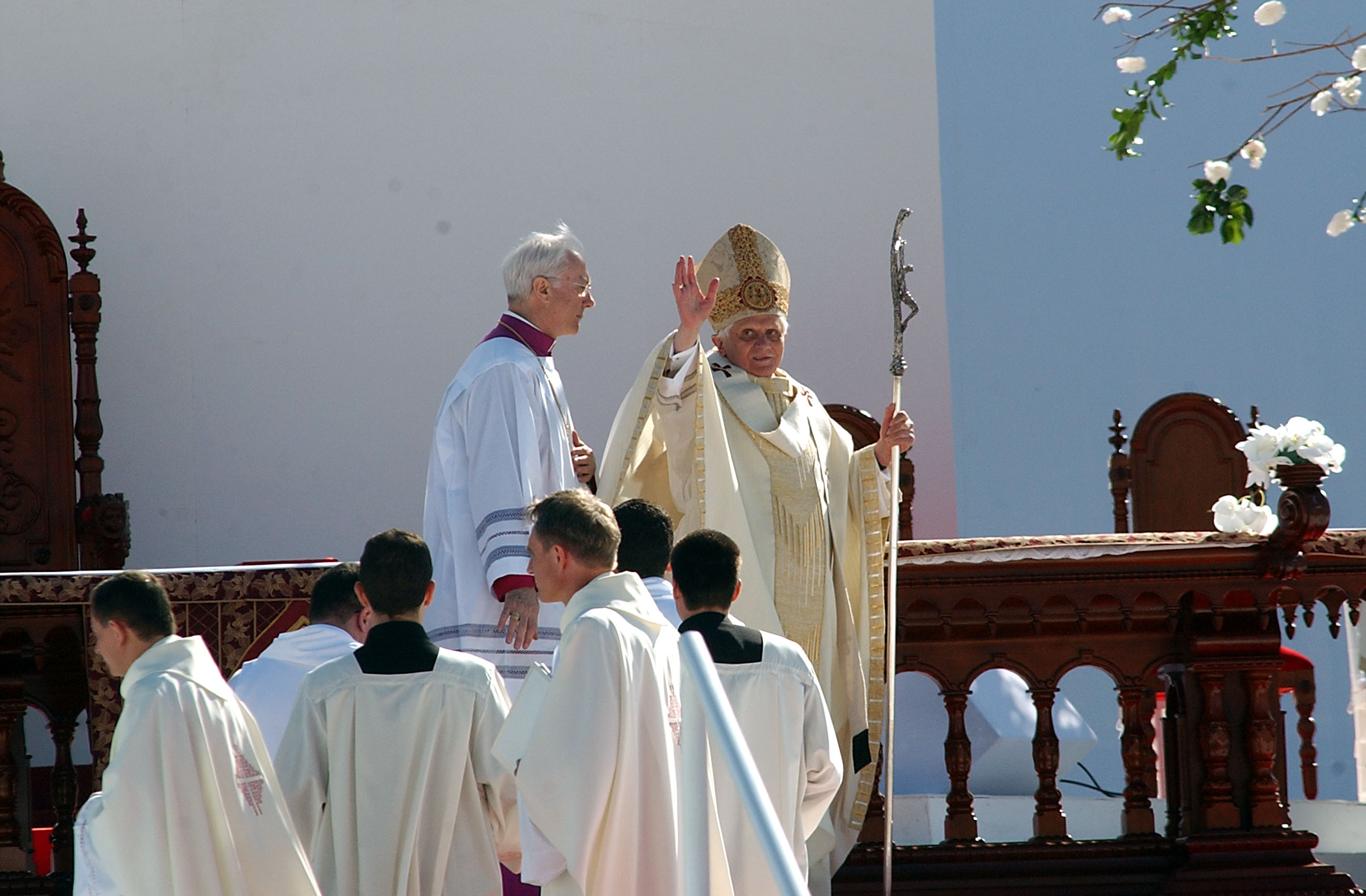
Pope Benedict with the crosier created by Gib Singleton

After being recruited by and working in the Vatican Workshop, where he assisted in the restoration of Michelangelo’s Pieta, Singleton returned to the U.S. to concentrate on his own work. He tells of selling his work on the streets of New York City, sleeping on the Connecticut beaches, and often going hungry while developing the unique style that he has termed, "emotional realism". He then became head of the sculpture department at Fairfield University in Fairfield, Connecticut. During this time, he visited the Frederic Remington Art Museum in Ogdensburg, New York. Singleton had been developing his own western style since boyhood, and the works of Remington convinced him to move to Santa Fe, New Mexico and create western art.

Despite his many years of producing western art, Singleton is, perhaps, better known for his religious works. The "bowed cross" that he developed while still a young boy in Missouri is featured in many of his works, including atop the crosier originally carried by Pope John Paul II, later by Pope Benedict XVI, and now by Pope Francis. One of his crucifixes rests near the Shroud of Turin.

In recent years, Singleton often collaborated with his daughter, Shelly, who is also a sculptor of some repute.

The work of Singleton, along with that of painter Earl Biss, encouraged a group of collectors of their art to develop the Singleton-Biss Museum of Fine Art in Santa Fe, to share their joint collection of the works of "contemporary American visual artists." The museum opened to the public in 2008.

Singleton died at his home at Santa Fe, New Mexico on February 28, 2014. He is survived by his third wife, Evangeline Harris-Singleton; two of his four children, Shelly Jay Kinder Singleton and Sherri Kay Dooley; three grandchildren and two great-grandchildren; three step-children and four step-grandchildren; one of two brothers and one of two sisters and several nieces and nephews; two former wives; and his two loyal, companion dogs.

== Works ==
In addition to the bronze crucifix atop the Popes' crosier, Singleton's crucifixes, crosses and other sculptures are on display in Italy at the Vatican Museums in Rome, the Cathedral of Saint John the Baptist in Turin (home to the Shroud of Turin), and the Accademia di Belle Arti in Florence.

In 2015 the Museum of Biblical Art displayed 14 life-sized Singleton bronze sculptures.

His works are also displayed in the U.S. Holocaust Memorial Museum in Washington, D.C., the Olympic Museum in Lausanne, Switzerland, the Museum of Modern Art and the Museum of Biblical Art in New York City, Creighton University in Omaha as well as the National Cowboy & Western Heritage Museum in Oklahoma City and the ProRodeo Hall of Fame and Museum in Colorado Springs.

Fourteen of his life-size pieces are featured in the Stations of the Cross Prayer Garden at the Cathedral Basilica of Saint Francis of Assisi in Santa Fe, New Mexico.

The State of Israel owns a collection of Singleton's works which were a bequest to the nation by the late Golda Meir.

Other Singleton works are held by individuals, corporations and museums around the world.
