= John Burgee =

American architect

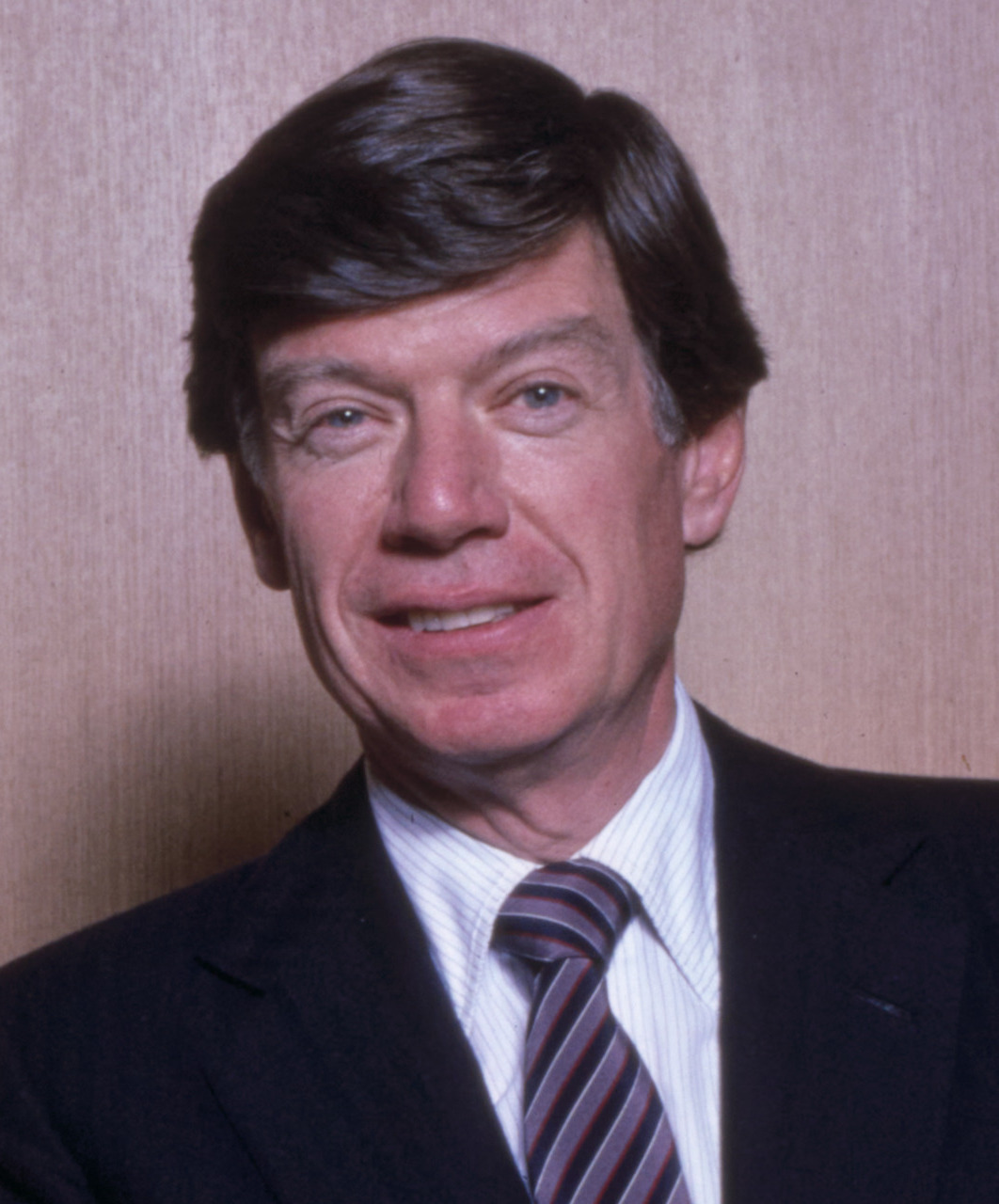
- Burgee in 1977
- Born: August 28, 1933 (age 93); Chicago, Illinois, U.S.
- Education: University of Notre Dame
- Occupation: Architect
- Buildings: Sony Building (New York)

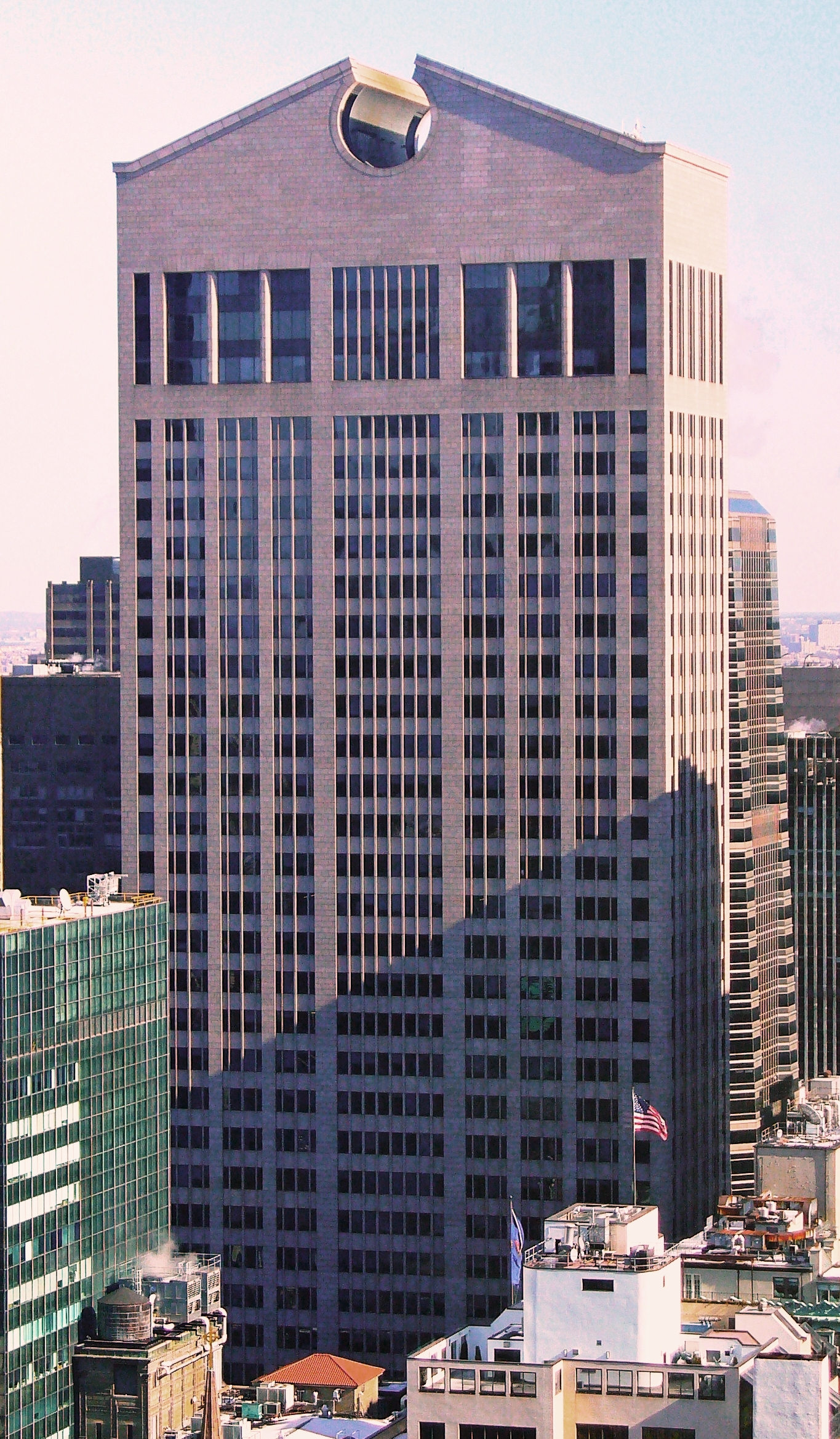
The Sony Building in New York City, formerly AT&T World Headquarters

John Burgee (born August 28, 1933) is an American architect noted for his contributions to Postmodern architecture. He was a partner of Philip Johnson from 1967 to 1991, creating together the partnership firm Johnson/Burgee Architects. Their landmark collaborations included Pennzoil Place in Houston and the AT&T World Headquarters in New York. Burgee eased Johnson out of the firm in 1991, and when it subsequently went bankrupt, Burgee's design career was essentially over. Burgee is retired, and resides in California.

== Life and career ==
Burgee graduated from the School of Architecture at the University of Notre Dame in 1956, and served on the university's board of trustees from 1988 until 2006, when he was named trustee emeritus, and on the School of Architecture's advisory council from 1982. He also served on the boards of the Architectural League of New York, Lenox Hill Hospital, Columbia University's Master of Sciences Program in Real Estate Development, the Parsons School of Design, and the Friends of the Upper East Side Historic District, and was the co-chairman of the Architectural Committee of the Statue of Liberty/Ellis Island Centennial Commission. For the Institute for Architecture and Urban Studies, Burgee was president and chairman.

== Johnson/Burgee Architects ==
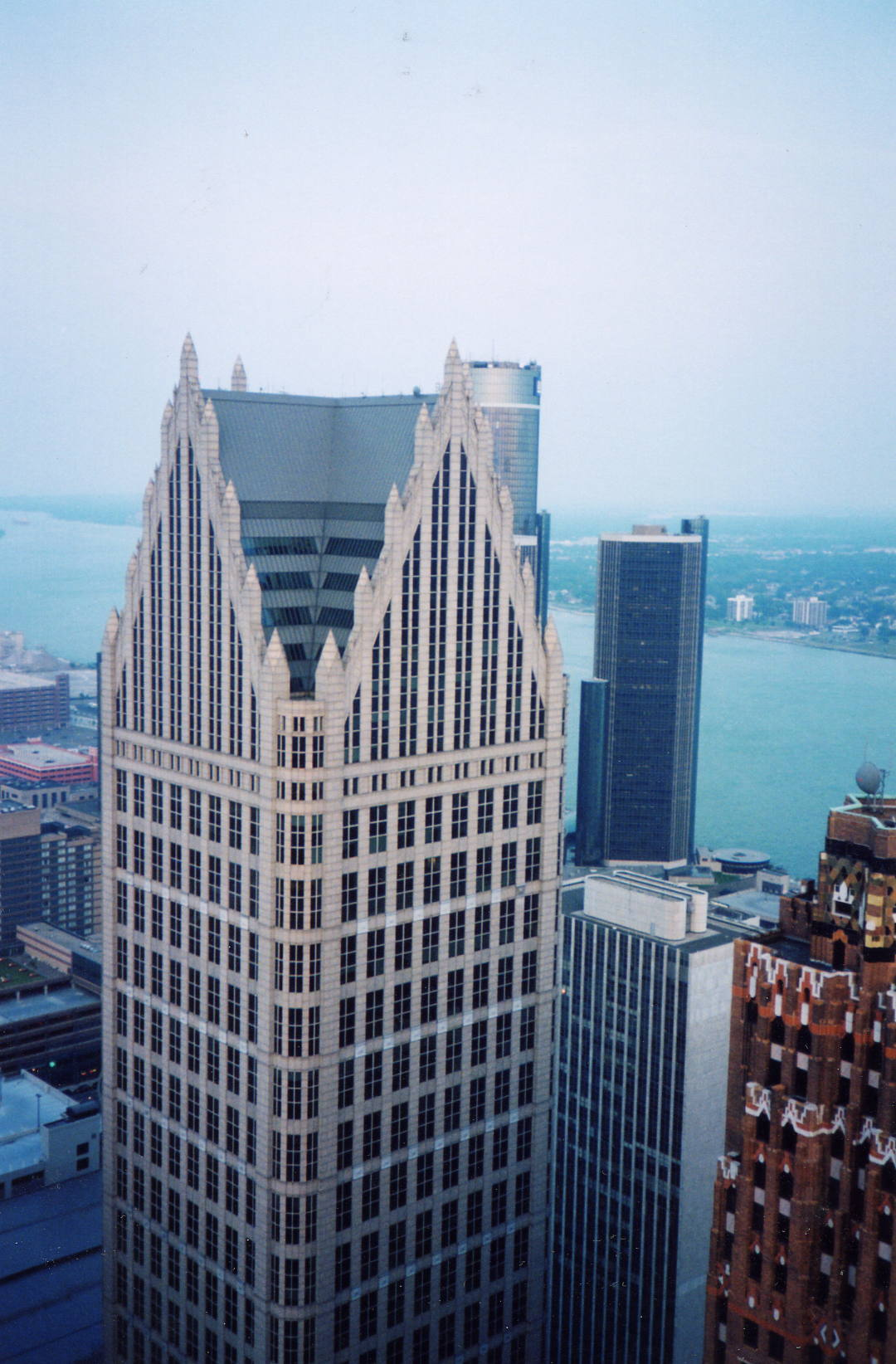
Comerica Tower in Detroit.

John Burgee and Philip Johnson established Johnson/Burgee in Manhattan in 1968, with Burgee as the firm's CEO, and they collaborated on many designs. In 1984, Raj Ahuja, who had been an associate with the firm for 15 years, was made a full partner. Two years later, they moved into the Lipstick Building at 885 Third Avenue, between 53rd and 54th Streets, which the firm had designed. That same year, Burgee negotiated a lesser role in the partnership for Johnson, as a design consultant, and in 1988 he asked Ahuja to leave. Completing the transformation of the firm, in 1991 Johnson left altogether, at Burgee's behest. Shortly thereafter, the firm went into bankruptcy because of an arbitration connected to Ahuja's leaving, and Burgee's career was dealt a serious blow.

Their collaborations include:

- 1969 – Master plan for Roosevelt Island in the East River, New York City
- 1973 – Niagara Falls Convention Center (now Seneca Niagara Casino), Niagara Falls, New York
- 1973 – 49th Street BMT Subway Station (reconstruction), Manhattan, New York City
- 1974 – Morningside House (Reception Building and Administration and Medical Services Building), The Bronx, New York City
- 1974 – Fort Worth Water Gardens, Fort Worth, Texas
- 1974 – Neuberger Museum of Art, SUNY Purchase, Purchase, New York
- 1974 – Air India Building, Bombay, India
- 1975 – Pennzoil Place, Houston, Texas
- 1976 – Reconstruction of the interior of Avery Fisher Hall, Manhattan, New York City
- 1977 – Century Center (South Bend), South Bend, Indiana
- 1980 – 1001 Fifth Avenue (apartment building), Manhattan, New York City
- 1981 – Bank of America Center, Block 84, Houston, Texas
- 1983 – Williams Tower (formerly Transco Tower), Houston, Texas
- 1984 – PPG Place, Pittsburgh
- 1984 – Sony Building, Manhattan, New York City
- 1982 – 33 Maiden Lane, Manhattan, New York City
- 1983 – "Lipstick Building", 885 Third Avenue, Manhattan, New York City
- 1986 – The Crescent (Dallas), Dallas, Texas
- 1986 – Tycon Center, Fairfax County, Virginia
- 1987 – 190 South LaSalle Street, Chicago, Ill.; Burgee's first skyscraper in Chicago, where he was born
- 1987 – Comerica Bank Tower, Dallas, Texas
- 1984 – One Atlantic Center (IBM Building), Atlanta
- 1983 – 500 Boylston Street, Boston
- 1989 – Gate of Europe, Madrid, Spain
- 1989 – Museum of Television and Radio, Manhattan, New York City
- 1990 – 191 Peachtree Tower, Atlanta
- 1991 – One Detroit Center, Detroit (Ally Detroit Center)
- 1991 – 101 Collins Street, Melbourne, Australia
- 1993 – 400 West Market, Louisville, Kentucky

== Awards and honors ==
- 1978: AIA Award for Pennzoil Place
- 1983: Honorary Doctorate in Engineering, University of Notre Dame
- 1984: Chicago Architecture Award, Illinois Council of the AIA (first recipient)
- 2004: Orlando T. Maione Award for distinguished contributions to the Notre Dame School of Architecture
