= Pennzoil Place =

Building complex in Houston, Texas, U.S.

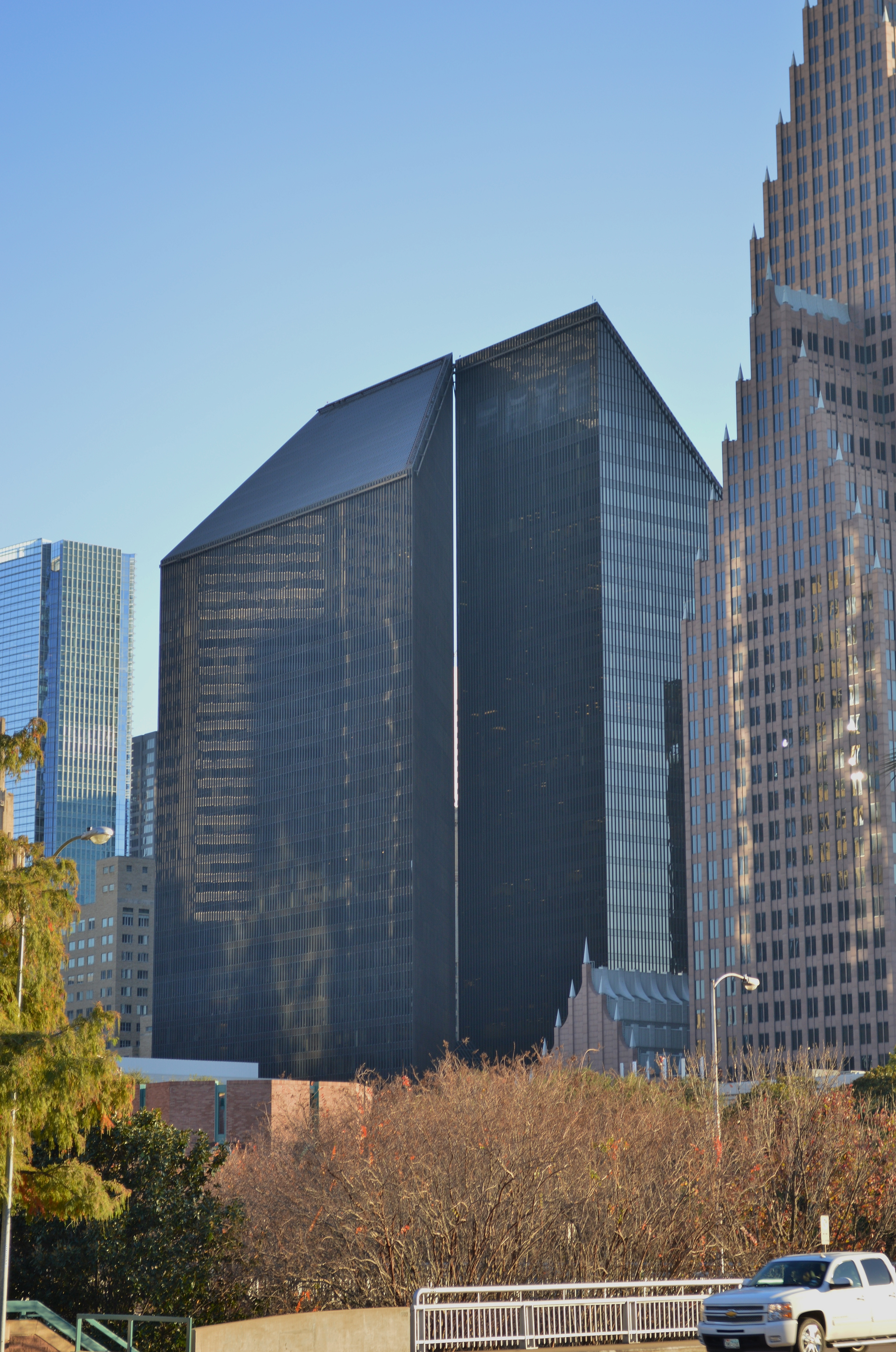
- Pennzoil Place in 2013

General information
- Status: Completed
- Location: Downtown Houston, Texas, United States
- Coordinates: 29.7603°N 95.3657°W
- Completed: 1975

Height
- Roof: 523 ft (159 m)

Technical details
- Floor count: 36
- Floor area: 1,597,385 ft^{2} (148,401.9 m^{2})

Design and construction
- Architects: Philip Johnson/John Burgee Architects (concept and design by Eli Attia, an architect with the firm)

Pennzoil Place is a set of two 36-story towers in Downtown Houston, Texas, United States. designed by Philip Johnson/John Burgee Architects from a concept by Eli Attia, a staff architect with the firm. Completed in 1976, it is Houston's most award-winning skyscraper and is widely known for its innovative design.

== History ==
Pennzoil Place was designed by Philip Johnson and John Burgee of Johnson/Burgee Architects. The building was completed in 1975. In May 1976 Deutsche Bank and other partners in a West German investment group bought a 90 percent interest in the Pennzoil Place building for $100 million.

As of 2002 Arthur Andersen was vacating about 300,000 square feet (28,000 m^{2}) of space in Pennzoil Place. In 2025, the development was placed for sale for the first time since its construction.

== Development and style ==
Pennzoil Place, developed and managed by Gerald D. Hines Interests, consists of two 495 ft (151 m) trapezoidal towers placed ten feet apart and sheathed in dark bronze glass and aluminum. The buildings are mirror images of each other. The entire street-level plaza joining the two structures is enclosed in a 115-foot (35 m) glass pyramid-shaped atrium. Deliberately designed as an optical illusion, Pennzoil Place's appearance will vary depending on the different locations from where it is viewed. Pennzoil Place is considered significant in architectural circles for breaking the modernist glass box design made popular by followers of Ludwig Mies van der Rohe and for introducing the era of postmodernism. The buildings combined contain 1,400,000 square feet (130,000 m^{2}) of leasable space.

The interior offices were designed by M. Arthur Gensler Jr. & Associates, the San Francisco-based interior architecture firm.

Architect Philip Johnson was awarded the 1978 AIA Gold Medal and became the first laureate of the Pritzker Prize in Architecture in 1979 for his work on Pennzoil Place. Pennzoil Place was named "Building of the Decade" in 1975 by The New York Times architecture critic Ada Louise Huxtable because of the dramatic silhouette it added to the Houston skyline.

Views of Pennzoil Place
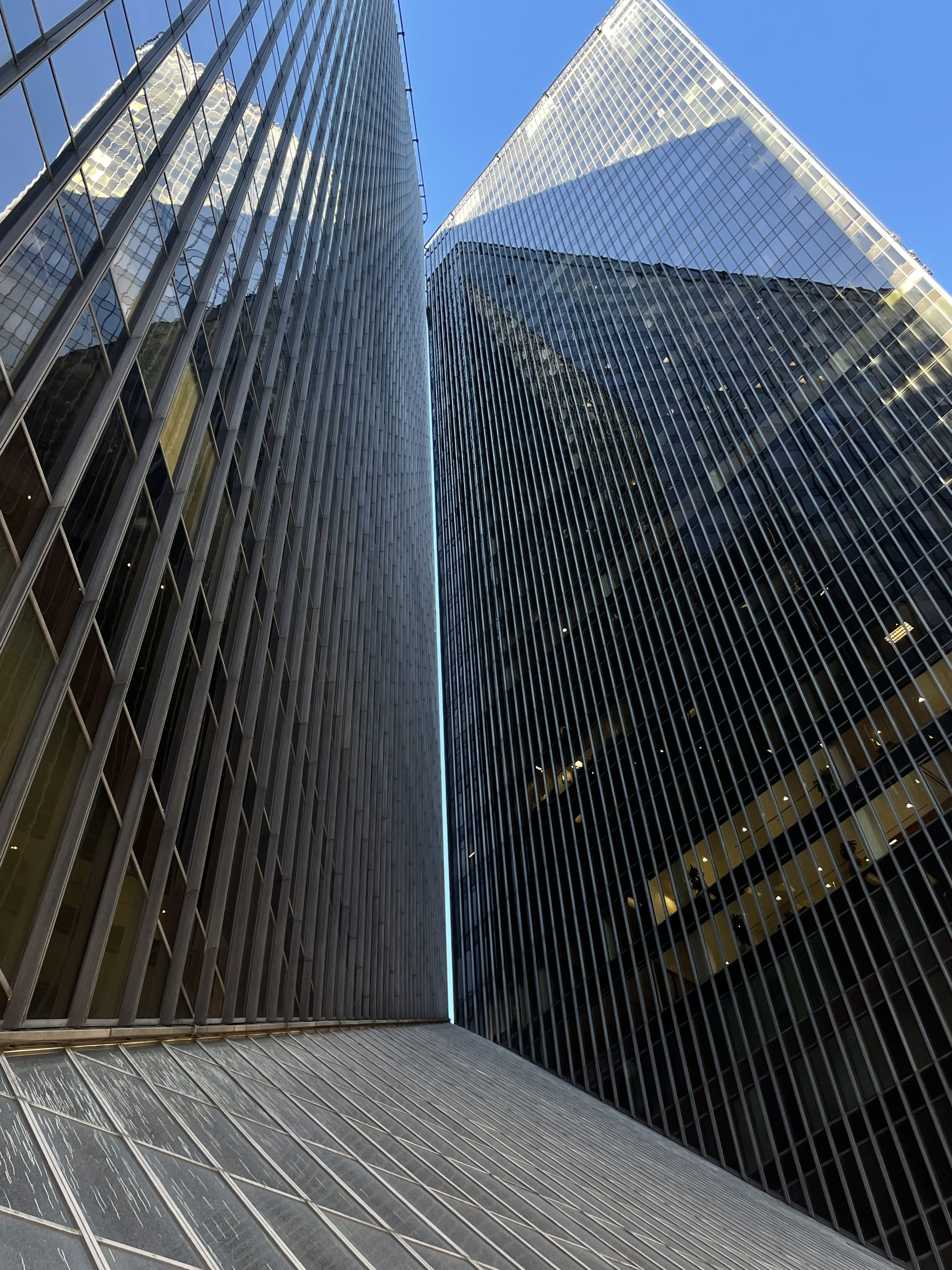
Exterior view of the gap between towers.

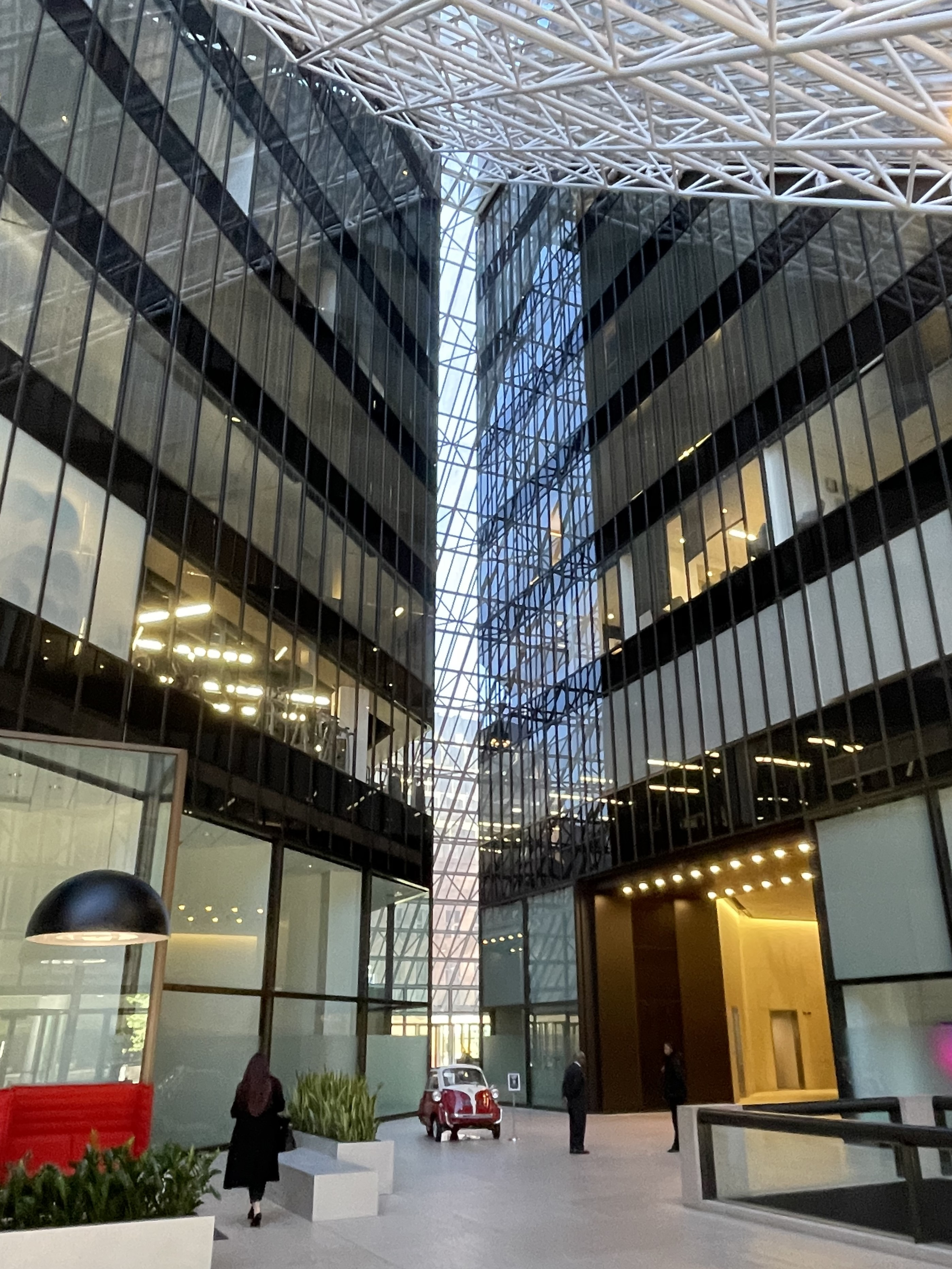
East lobby.

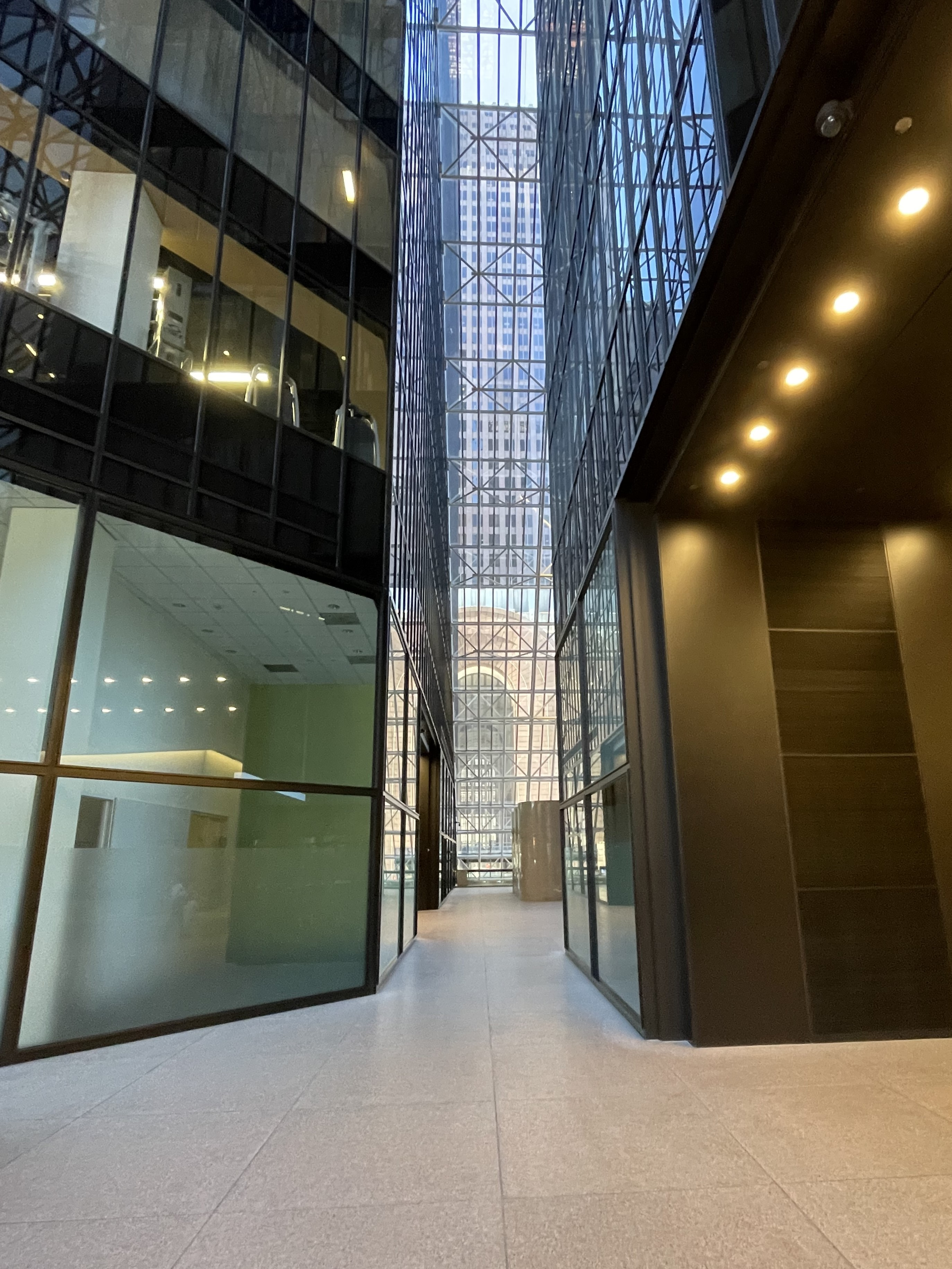
Gap between towers in the lobby/atrium.

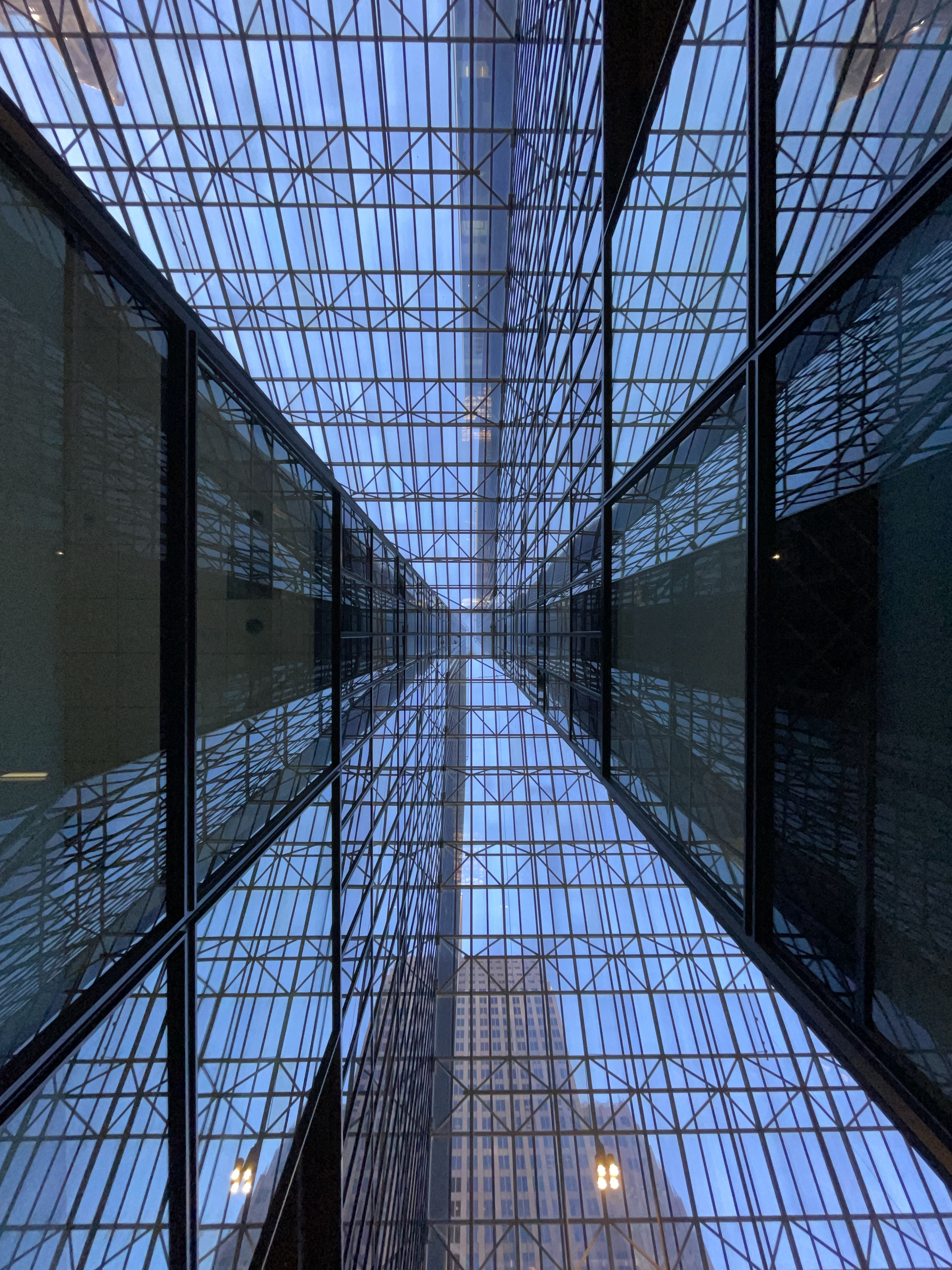
Atrium ceiling from between the two towers.

== See also ==
- List of tallest buildings in Houston
- Architecture of Houston
- List of tallest buildings in Texas
