= Williams Tower =

Skyscraper in Houston, Texas

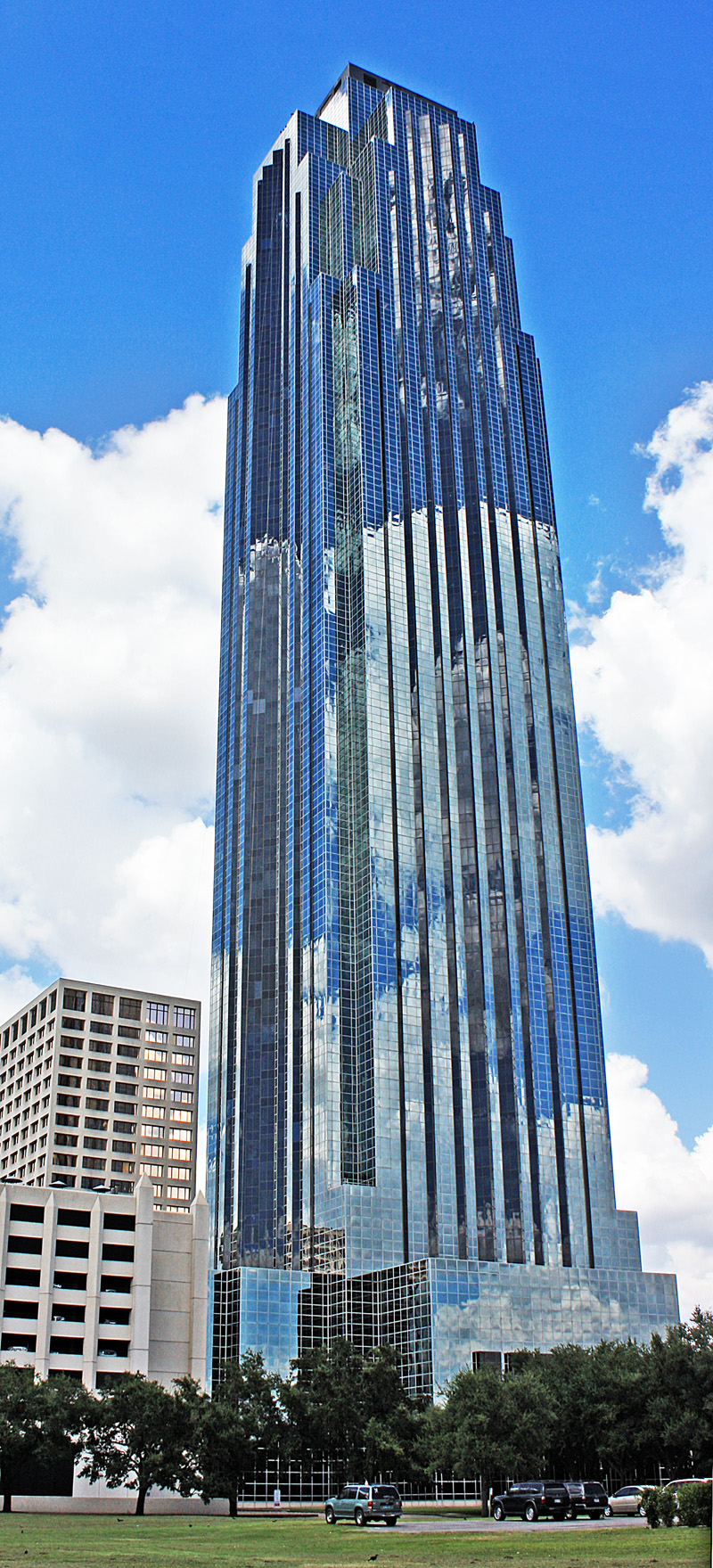
- Williams Tower in 2011
- Former names: Transco Tower (1982–1998)

General information
- Status: Completed
- Type: Office tower
- Architectural style: Postmodern
- Location: 2800 Post Oak Boulevard, Houston, Texas, United States
- Coordinates: 29°44′14″N 95°27′41″W
- Elevation: up
- Current tenants: Williams Companies; LyondellBasell; Camden Property Trust; Morgan Stanley Wealth Management; Consulate General of Denmark, Houston; Honorary consulates of Finland
- Groundbreaking: August 1981; 45 years ago
- Completed: Between December 1982 and January 1983
- Opened: 1983; 43 years ago
- Cost: U.S. $300 million
- Owner: Williams 2800 Post Oak LLC
- Landlord: Hines Interests Limited Partnership

Height
- Roof: 275 m (902 ft)

Technical details
- Floor count: 64
- Floor area: 1,483,308 sq ft (137,803.8 m^{2})
- Lifts/elevators: 49

Design and construction
- Architecture firm: John Burgee Architects with Philip Johnson and Morris-Aubry Architects
- Structural engineer: CBM Engineers Inc.
- Main contractor: J.A. Jones Construction Co.
- Awards: Award for Architectural Excellence (AISC)

Website
- williamstower.com

The Williams Tower (originally named the Transco Tower) is a 64-story, 1.4 million square feet (130,000 m^{2}) class A postmodern office tower located in the Uptown District of Houston, Texas. The building was designed by New York–based John Burgee Architects with Philip Johnson in association with Houston-based Morris-Aubry Architects (now known as Morris Architects). Construction began in August 1981, and the building was opened in 1983. The tower is among Houston's most visible buildings as the 4th-tallest in Texas, and the 51st-tallest in the United States. The Williams Tower is the tallest building in Houston outside of Downtown Houston, and is the tallest skyscraper in the United States outside of a city's central business district.

== History ==
Real estate developer Gerald D. Hines hired New York–based John Burgee Architects with Philip Johnson to design the building, in association with Houston-based Morris-Aubry Architects (now known as Morris Architects). Construction was completed in 1983. At the time of its completion, it was the tallest skyscraper west of the Mississippi River, standing at 64 stories (901 feet).

The building was originally named for its first major tenant and the company that commissioned it, Transco Energy Corporation. In 1995, Transco was acquired by Williams Companies, and, in 1999, became Williams Tower.

In 2008, Hines REIT Properties LP, an affiliate of Hines Real Estate Investment Trust Inc., purchased the Williams Tower for $271.5 million from Transco Tower Ltd., a partnership consisting of Kuwaiti investors represented by Atlanta-based Fosterlane Management Corp. The building was offered along with a parking garage, a 2.3-acre (0.93 ha) tract across the street from the Williams Tower, and a 48% stake in the Williams Waterwall (now named the Gerald D. Hines Waterwall Park) and the surrounding park; prior to this transaction Hines had already owned the other 52% of the waterwall.

On the morning of September 13, 2008, during Hurricane Ike, the top of the tower was damaged near the rotating beacon, and many windows were blown out. The skyscraper suffered over $3.5 million in wind damage. Twelve of the 49 elevators were damaged, most by water damage.

Hines Real Estate Investment Trust Inc. put the Williams Tower up for sale in August 2012, selling it to Invesco Ltd. subsidiary Invesco Advisers Inc. for $412 million in March 2013.

In July 2026, Williams Companies closed on a $300 million-plus deal to purchase the building from Invesco.

== Major tenants ==
The building was originally named for its major tenant, Transco Energy corporation, now part of the Williams Companies, the tower's current namesake. The tower also served as the headquarters for the Hines companies until mid-2022.

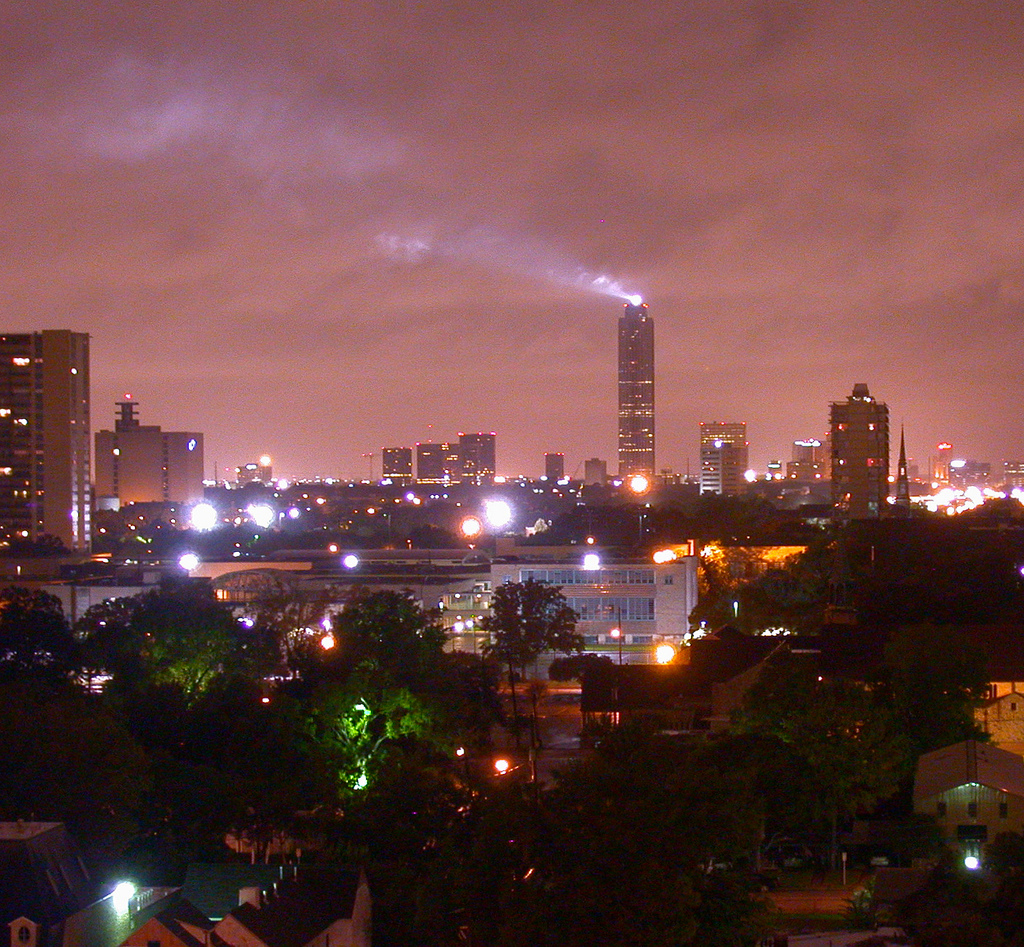
The beacon of the Williams Tower, 2002

== Significance ==
At 64 stories and 909 feet (277 m) above the ground level, the Williams Tower is the tallest building in Houston outside of Downtown Houston. When it was constructed in 1983, it was also the world's tallest skyscraper outside of a city's central business district.

The building was built to function as two separate towers stacked directly on top of one another, one comprising the first forty floors and the other the forty-first to sixty-fourth. The building has separate banks of elevators and lobbies for each of the two building sections.

Williams Tower was named "Skyscraper of the Century" in the December 1999 issue of Texas Monthly magazine. Paul Gapp of the Chicago Tribune said that the building became an "instant classic" when it opened. Paul Goldberger of The New York Times said that the tower gave Post Oak Boulevard "a center, an anchor, which most out-towns lack".

== Features ==
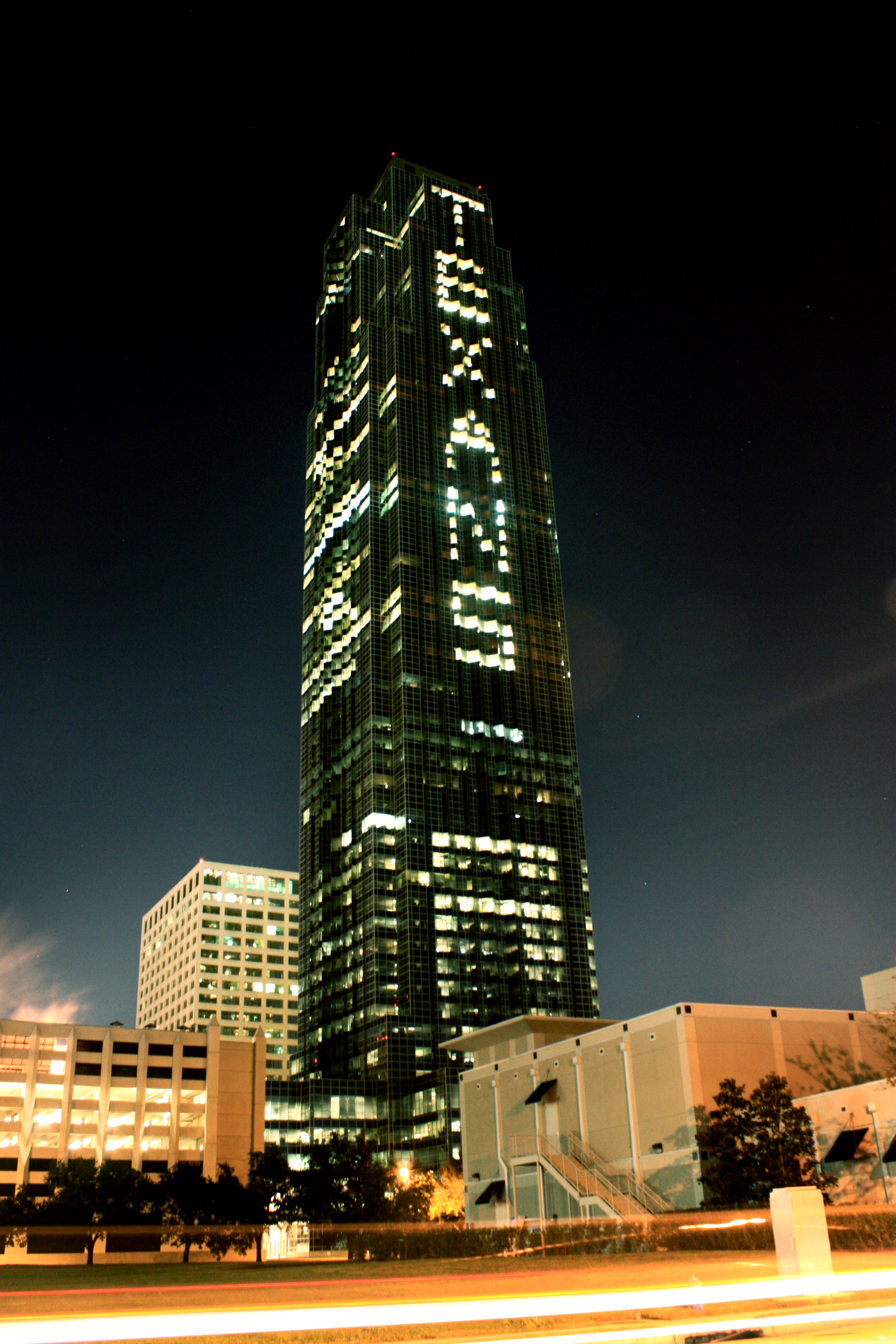
Williams Tower showing the word "TEXANS" using its office lights, the night before a Houston Texans game.

Six elevators take tenants to the 51st floor, where they can transfer to other elevators to get to the 49th through 64th floor of the building. There is no public observation deck.

During the nighttime hours, the building is defined by a 7,000 watt beacon that sweeps across the sky and can be seen up to 40 miles (65 km) away on a clear night. Topped by such a beacon, the tower hearkens back to the Palmolive Building in Chicago, Illinois. The building, along with its beacon, is a Houston landmark that identifies the Uptown Houston district.

The building is connected to a 10 level, 3,208 car parking garage by a sky bridge. The bridge also connects the building to retail outlets, like The Galleria, and two Federal Aviation Administration-licensed helipads.

In a grass field adjacent to the Williams Tower is the Gerald D. Hines Waterwall Park. Formerly privately owned in common with the tower, the waterwall and park has been owned by the Uptown Houston Tax Increment Reinvestment Zone, a non-profit local government corporation since 2008.

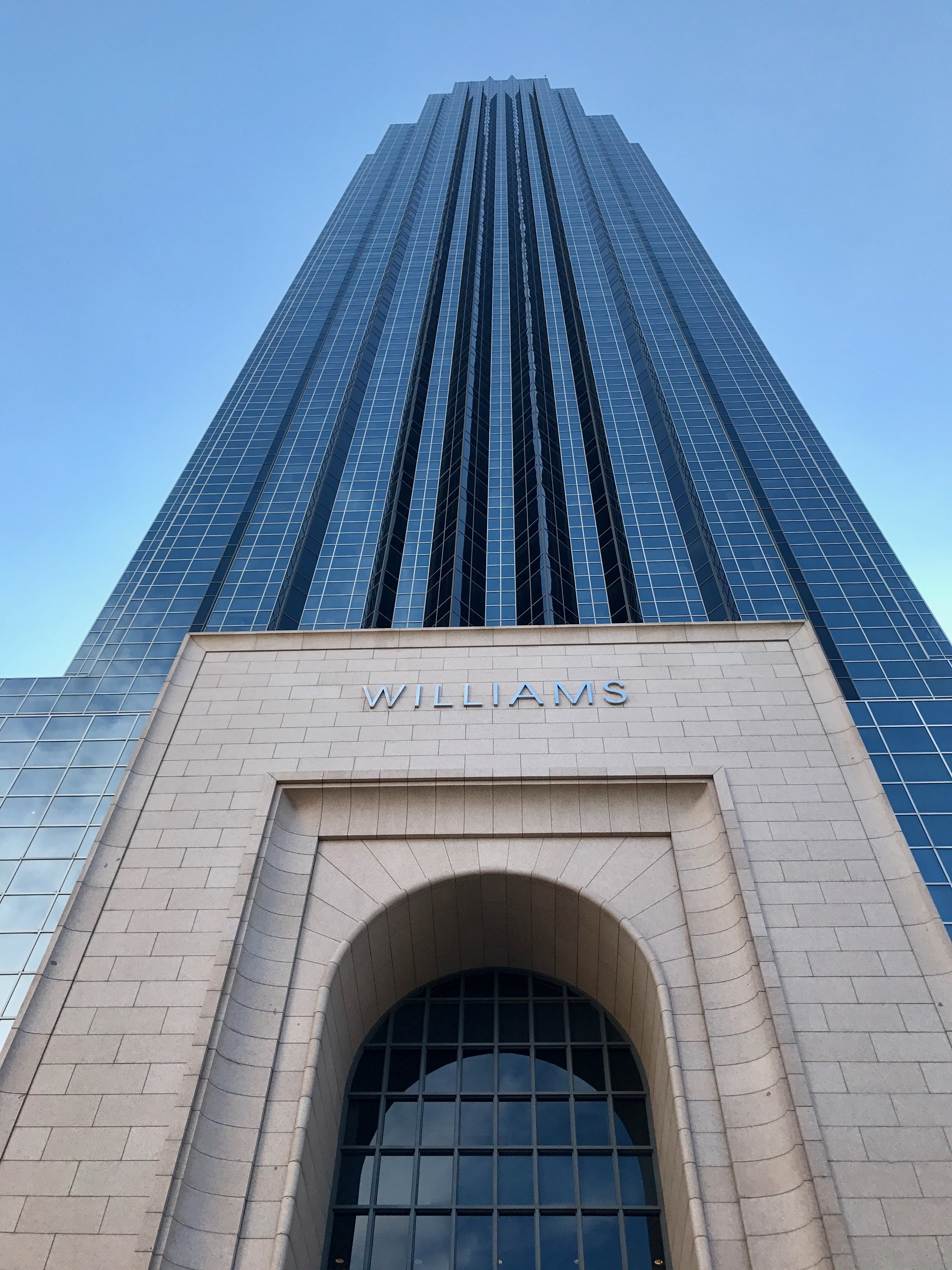
Upward view of the Williams Tower during the day

The Houston Business Journal said that the tower was "designed to be energy efficient". The building received the Environmental Protection Agency's Energy Star label for each year since 2000 in which the building was eligible to receive the award. The Williams Tower maintains LEED Gold Status Leadership in Energy and Environmental Design (LEED) certification from the United States Green Building Council.

The top four angles of the building form cat-like shapes with tails that run down all the way to street level.

Ziegler Cooper Architects redesigned the lobby, skybridge and lounge which overlooks Gerald D. Hines Waterwall Park.

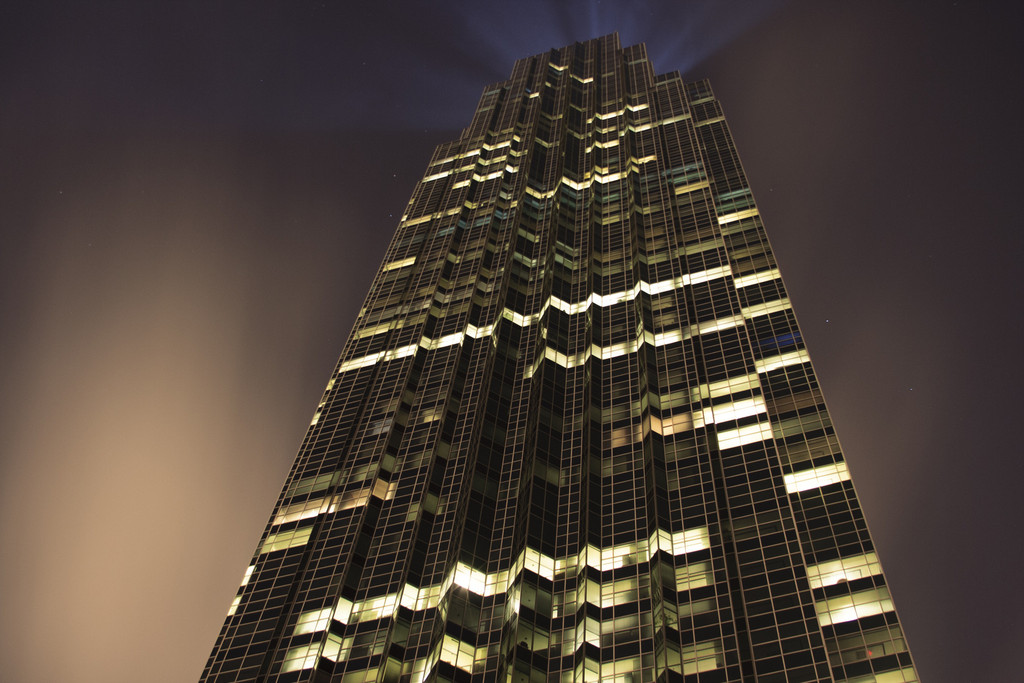
A long exposure of the Williams Tower spotlight at night.

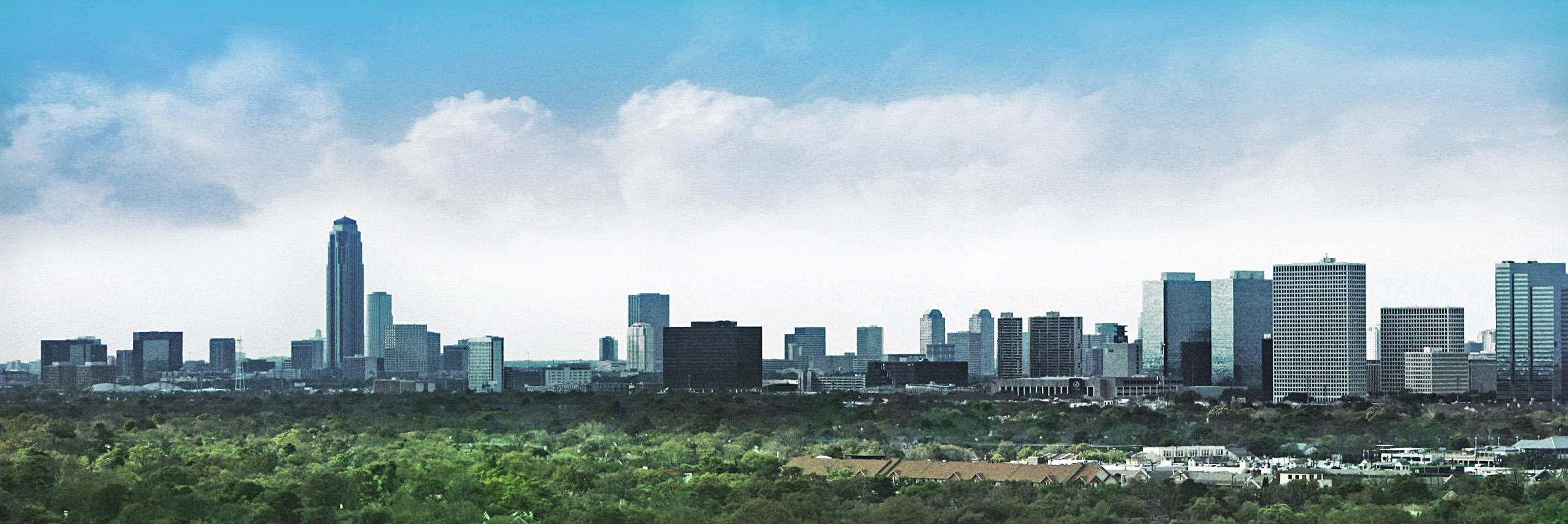
Panoramic view of one of the Uptown Skylines. The Williams Tower is clearly distinguished

== See also ==
- List of tallest buildings in Houston
- List of tallest buildings in Texas
- List of tallest buildings in the United States
- List of tallest freestanding steel structures
