= South Station =

Rail station in Boston, Massachusetts, US

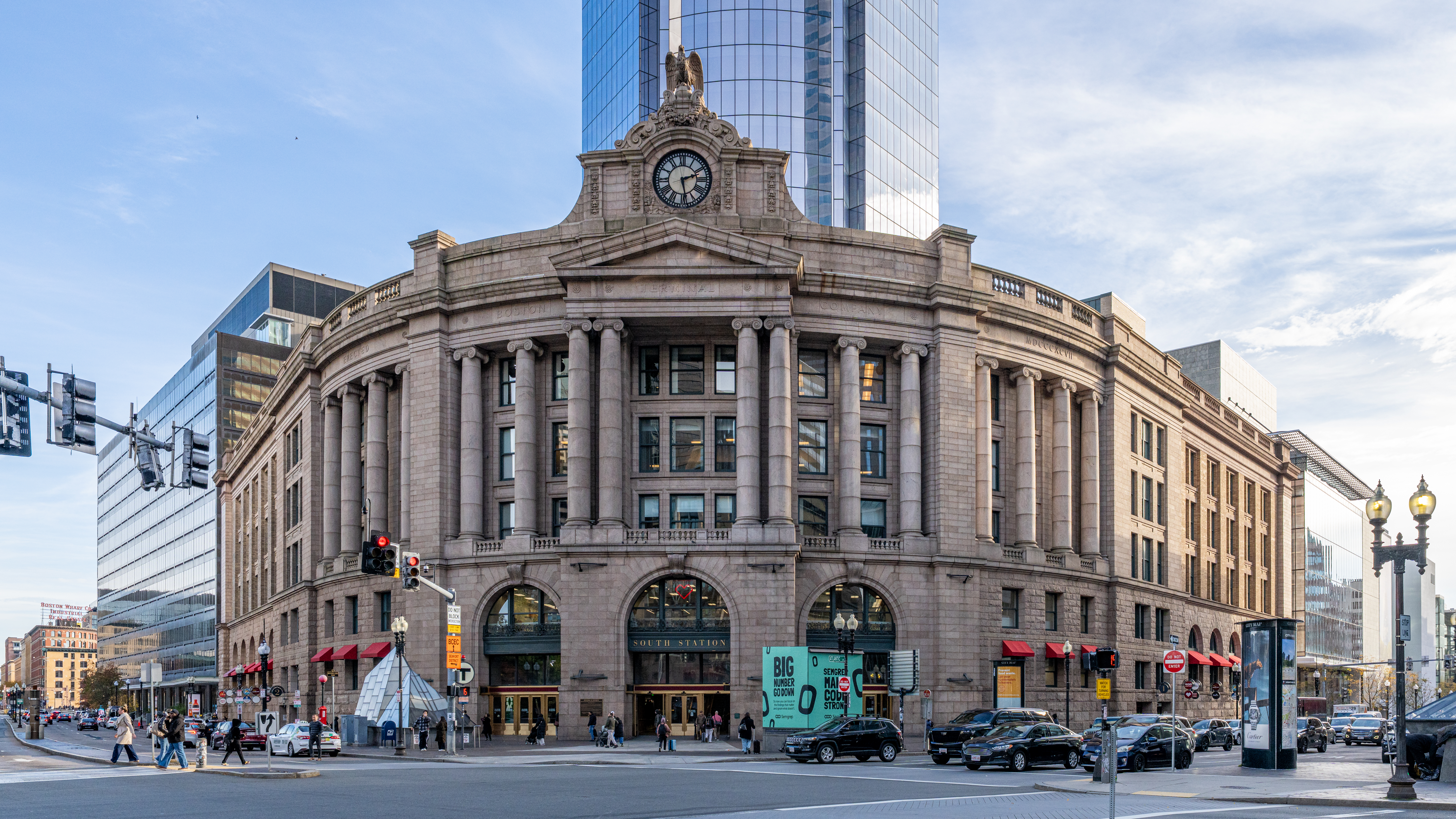
- The exterior of South Station, with the South Station Tower in the background (2025)

General information
- Location: 700 Atlantic Avenue; Boston, Massachusetts; United States
- Owner: Massachusetts Department of Transportation
- Lines: Attleboro Line (Northeast Corridor); Dorchester Branch; Middleborough Main Line
- Platforms: 6 island platforms, 2 side platforms (Historically 14 island platforms)
- Tracks: 13
- Connections: Intercity buses at bus terminal Red Line, Silver Line at subway station MBTA bus: 4, 7, 11

Construction
- Cycle facilities: Bike lockers (Currently closed due to construction)
- Accessible: Yes

Other information
- Station code: Amtrak: BOS
- IATA code: ZTO
- Fare zone: 1A (MBTA Commuter Rail)
- Website: bostonsouthstation.com

History
- Opened: 1899
- Rebuilt: 1985

Passengers
Amtrak
- FY 2025: 1,884,275 annual
MBTA Commuter Rail
- 2024: 22,467 daily boardings
Services
Preceding station	Amtrak	Following station
Boston Back Bay toward Washington, D.C.	Acela	Terminus
Boston Back Bay toward Chicago	Lake Shore Limited	Terminus
Boston Back Bay toward Norfolk, Newport News or Roanoke	Northeast Regional	Terminus
Preceding station	MBTA	Following station
Back Bay toward Worcester	Framingham/Worcester Line	Terminus
Back Bay toward Needham Heights	Needham Line	Terminus
Back Bay weekdays toward Forge Park/495 or Foxboro	Franklin/Foxboro Line	Terminus
Newmarket toward Forge Park/495 or Foxboro	Franklin/Foxboro Line	Terminus
Back Bay toward Foxboro	Foxboro event service	Terminus
Back Bay toward Wickford Junction or Stoughton	Providence/Stoughton Line	Terminus
Newmarket toward Readville	Fairmount Line	Terminus
Terminus	Fall River/New Bedford Line	JFK/UMass toward Fall River or New Bedford
Terminus	Greenbush Line	JFK/UMass toward Greenbush
Terminus	Kingston Line	JFK/UMass toward Kingston
Terminus	CapeFLYER seasonal	Braintree toward Hyannis
Former services
Preceding station	Amtrak	Following station
Boston Back Bay toward Newport News	Twilight Shoreliner	Terminus
Route 128 toward New Haven	Beacon Hill	Terminus
Boston Back Bay 1978-1979 toward New Haven	Beacon Hill	Terminus
Boston Back Bay toward Tri-State	Hilltopper	Terminus
Boston Back Bay toward Harrisburg	Valley Forge 1974-1975, weekends only	Terminus
Boston Back Bay toward Philadelphia	Bay State	Terminus
Boston Back Bay toward St. Petersburg or Miami	Meteor	Terminus
Preceding station	MBTA	Following station
Back Bay toward Dedham	Dedham Branch Closed 1967	Terminus
Back Bay toward Millis	Millis Branch Closed 1967	Terminus
Preceding station	New York Central Railroad	Following station
Trinity Place / Huntington Avenue toward Albany	Boston and Albany Railroad Main Line	Terminus
Trinity Place / Huntington Avenue toward Riverside	Highland branch	Terminus
Preceding station	New York, New Haven and Hartford Railroad	Following station
Boston Back Bay toward New Haven	Shore Line	Terminus
Terminus	South Shore Line	Atlantic toward Greenbush
Uphams Corner toward Readville	Boston–Readville via Midland Branch	Terminus
- South Station Headhouse
- U.S. National Register of Historic Places
- Coordinates: 42°21′07″N 71°03′19″W
- Area: 0.5 acres (0.2 ha)
- Architect: Shepley, Rutan & Coolidge; Norcross Bros.
- Architectural style: Classical Revival
- NRHP reference No.: 75000299
- Added to NRHP: February 13, 1975
Track layout
- Streets, I-90, I-93, and SL4 are omitted For the MBTA subway station, see
Location

South Station is a railroad terminal located at Dewey Square in downtown Boston, Massachusetts. It is the busiest railroad station in Greater Boston and the second-busiest transportation facility. It is New England's second-largest transportation center after Logan International Airport. Along with North Station, it is one of two Boston terminals for the MBTA Commuter Rail system and Amtrak intercity rail service. South Station is a major intermodal transit hub; the South Station Bus Terminal is located above the platforms, and the adjacent subway station is served by the Red Line and Silver Line of the MBTA subway system.

Four terminals were built near downtown Boston in the 19th century to serve railroads running south and west from Boston. South Station was constructed in 1899 to replace these terminals with a union station. The Classical Revival structure was designed by Shepley, Rutan and Coolidge. Passenger rail service declined during the 20th century; the bankrupt railroads sold the station to the Boston Redevelopment Authority (BRA) in 1965. Portions of the station were demolished for redevelopment. Plans to demolish and redevelop the remaining section fell through; it was added to the National Register of Historic Places in 1975 as South Station Headhouse.

In 1978, the BRA sold what was left of the station to the Massachusetts Bay Transportation Authority (MBTA). A major renovation of the station, including the construction of accessible platforms, took place from 1984 to 1989. The bus terminal opened in 1995. The station was renamed for former Massachusetts governor Michael S. Dukakis in November 2014, officially becoming The Governor Michael S. Dukakis Transportation Center at South Station, though maps and station signs continue to use the shorter "South Station". The South Station Tower was built on air rights over the station from 2020 to 2025; it included an arched waiting area and expansion of the bus terminal. Proposed changes to the station include an expansion eastward with additional tracks, and a new underground station as part of the North–South Rail Link.

== Design and services ==
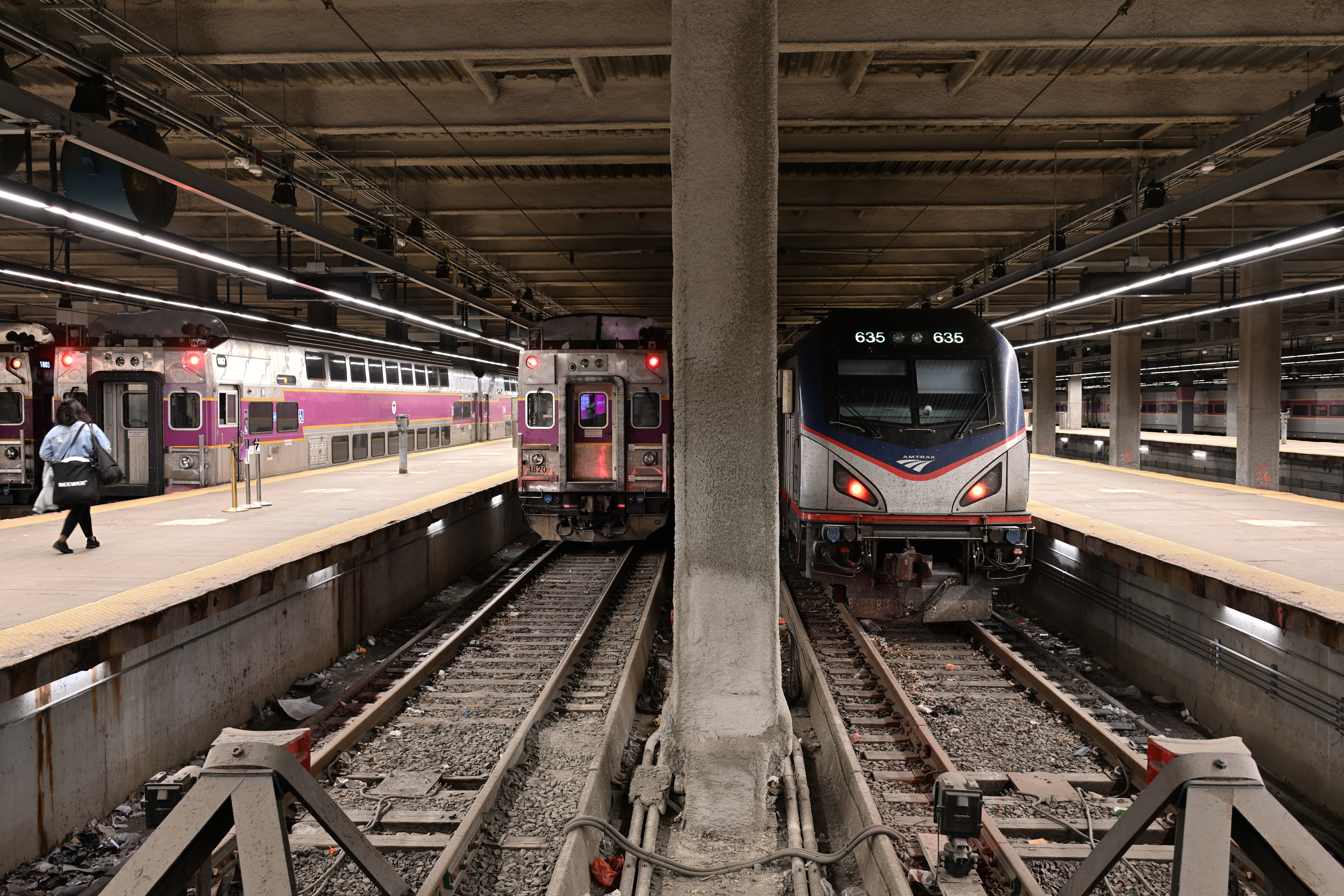
MBTA (left) and Amtrak (right) trains at South Station

South Station is located on the southeast corner of Atlantic Avenue and Summer Street in Dewey Square in the Financial District of Boston. The station building faces Dewey Square, with the tracks running southwest parallel to Atlantic Avenue. The terminal has 13 tracks served by six island platforms and one side platform. It is the end point of the Worcester Main Line, Northeast Corridor, Dorchester Branch, and Old Colony mainline. The station building contains a waiting room, food court, ticket offices, and the Amtrak Metropolitan Lounge. South Station is fully accessible.

South Station is the downtown terminus for eight MBTA Commuter Rail services: the Framingham/Worcester Line, Needham Line, Franklin/Foxboro Line, Providence/Stoughton Line, Fairmount Line, Fall River/New Bedford Line, Kingston Line, and Greenbush Line. It is the Boston terminus for three Amtrak intercity services: Acela, Northeast Regional, and the Boston section of the Lake Shore Limited.

The South Station Bus Terminal, Boston's intercity and commuter bus terminal, is located over the platforms. The South Station subway station, located under Dewey Square, serves the Red Line and Silver Line (routes SL1, SL2, SL3, SLW) of the MBTA subway system. Silver Line route SL5 and several MBTA bus routes stop at street level.

=== Architecture ===
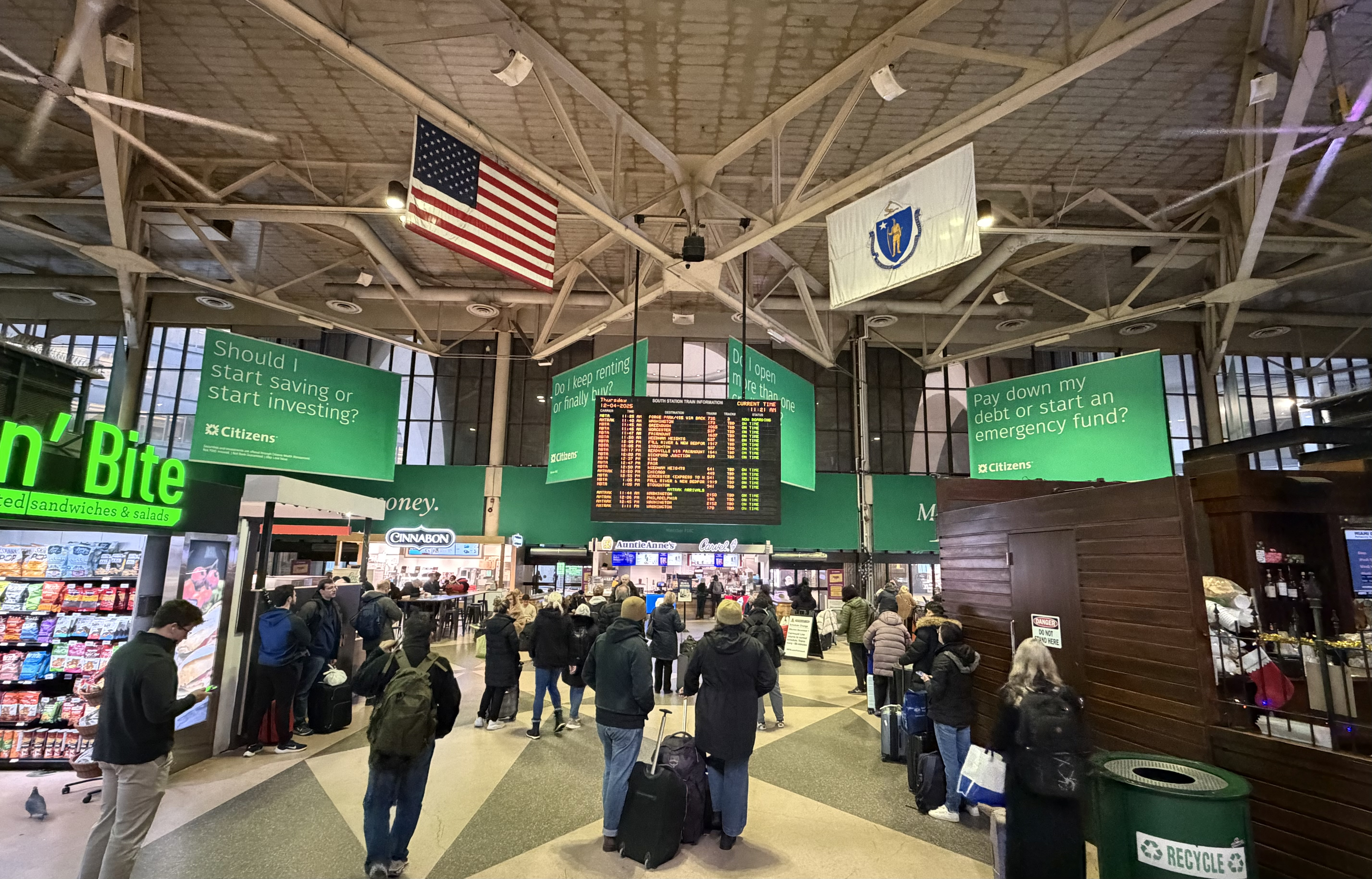
South Station waiting room

The South Station head house and wings incorporate Neoclassical architecture. The building's symmetry and stone façade are common to the style. The granite came from nearby quarries in New England. The main doorways are located in a section that protrudes from the curving shape of the building. The doors are housed under tall arches that give the impression of grandeur while also making the building appear smaller from far away. This visual trick is common in classical buildings and is further amplified by the oversized windows and large balustrade on the third floor and roof.

Above the doorways are classical Ionic order columns that ostensibly hold up the frieze and pediment. Uncommon for Ionic order columns is the lack of fluting, which is usually used to draw the eye upward, increasing the grandeur of the facade. The numerous projections and recessions on the façade attribute to the planar quality of the building, while also creating interesting shading and lighting patterns on the stone and within the building. Inside, a coffered ceiling adorns the terminal and protects travelers from the rain and snow.

Constructed over 100 years ago, the clock on top of the main head house is the largest operating hand-wound clock mechanism in New England. The clock is styled after London's Big Ben, and has a 12-foot (3.7 m) wide face. The mechanism weighs over 400 pounds (180 kg). In 2008, the clock was restored. It was disassembled and fitted with hand-made replacement parts. The classically styled stone eagle that sits atop the clock is 8 feet (2.4 m) wide and weighs over eight tons.

The curved shape of the building facade pushes its presence into the surrounding area, making it much more prominent. This also gives the building a more distinctive and accessible main entrance from Atlantic Avenue, Summer Street, and Dewey Square. A similar concept is also seen in the Santa Maria della Pace in Rome, Italy. This church did not directly influence South Station, but the designs clearly share the same effects on the immediate area.

Two works of public art, installed as part of the Arts on the Line program, are located inside South Station:

- Destinations (1995) by Jeffrey Schiff consists of 25 cast iron spindles hanging from the ceiling of the entrance foyer. Schiff was originally commissioned in 1980 for an artwork that would have consisted of granite columns in the main waiting room.
- Musclebound for Miami (1991) by Mayer Spivack is a 4,000-pound (1,800 kg) sculpture made from Type H railroad couplers located near the information desk. It was originally commissioned in 1981.

== History ==
=== Predecessors ===
When the railroads serving Boston were first laid out and built, each one stopped at its own terminal. By the late 19th century, four terminals served railroads entering Boston from the south:

- The New York and New England Railroad crossed the Fort Point Channel from South Boston, just south of the present Summer Street Bridge, and terminated just east of Dewey Square (right at the north end of today's South Station).
- The Old Colony Railroad had a long passenger terminal on the east side of South Street, stretching from Kneeland Street south to Harvard Street. This site is now part of the South Bay Interchange, near the South Station bus terminal.
- The Boston and Albany Railroad's passenger terminal was in the block bounded by Kneeland Street, Beach Street, Albany Street (now Surface Artery) and Lincoln Street. This later became a freight house, and is now a block in Chinatown; the passenger terminal was moved to the west side of Utica Street, from Kneeland Street south to a bit past Harvard Street, now part of the South Bay Interchange.
- The Boston and Providence Railroad continued straight where it now merges with the Boston and Albany, terminating at Park Square, with the passenger terminal on the south side of Providence Street from Columbus Avenue west about two-thirds of the way to Berkeley Street.

By the late 19th century, the New England, Old Colony, and Boston & Providence had been acquired by the New York, New Haven and Hartford Railroad, while the B&A was acquired by the New York Central Railroad. However, the four separate terminals remained. The Boston Terminal Company, established in 1897, was charged with the task of consolidating service from the four terminals at a single terminal (a union station).

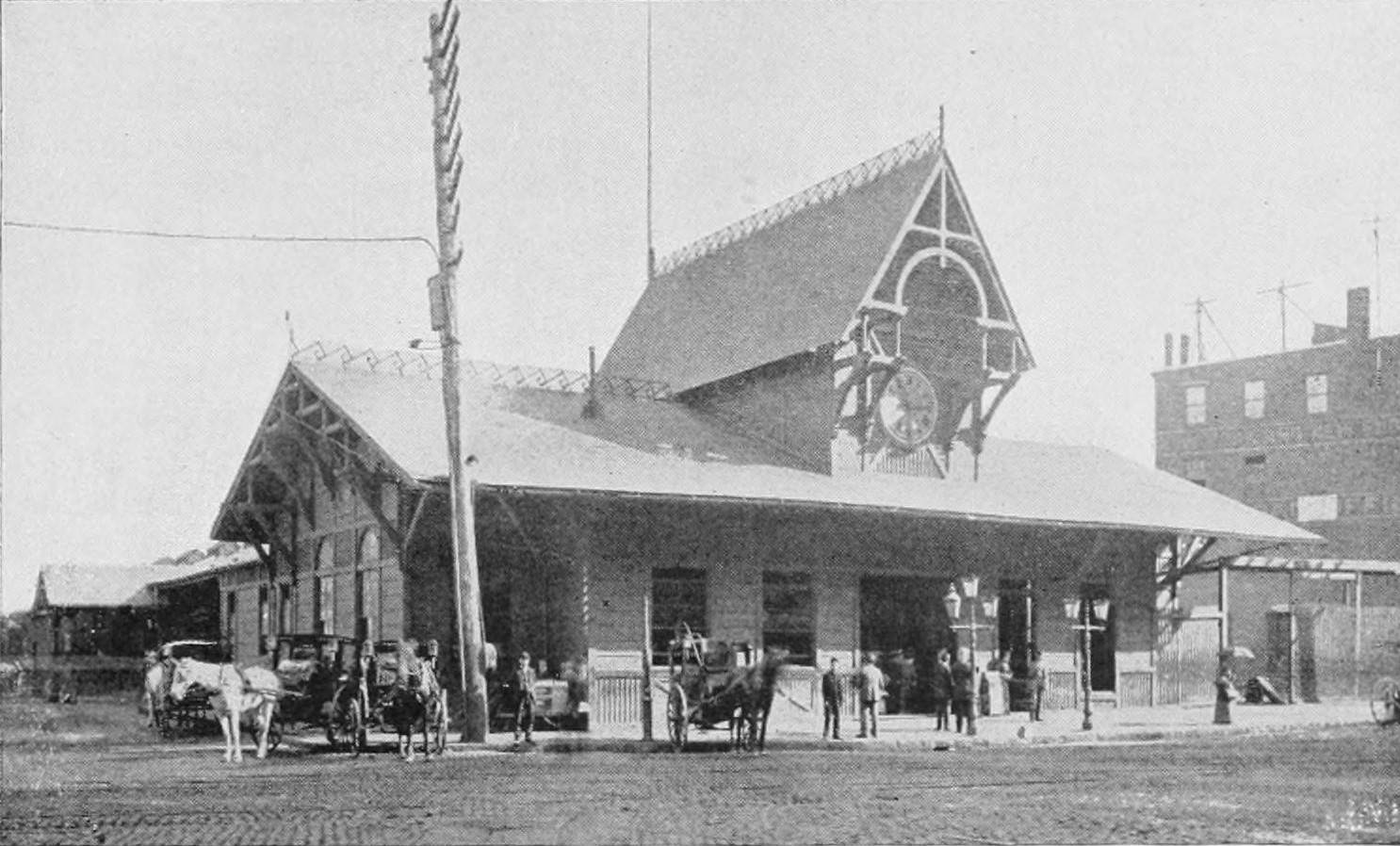
New York and New England Railroad terminal

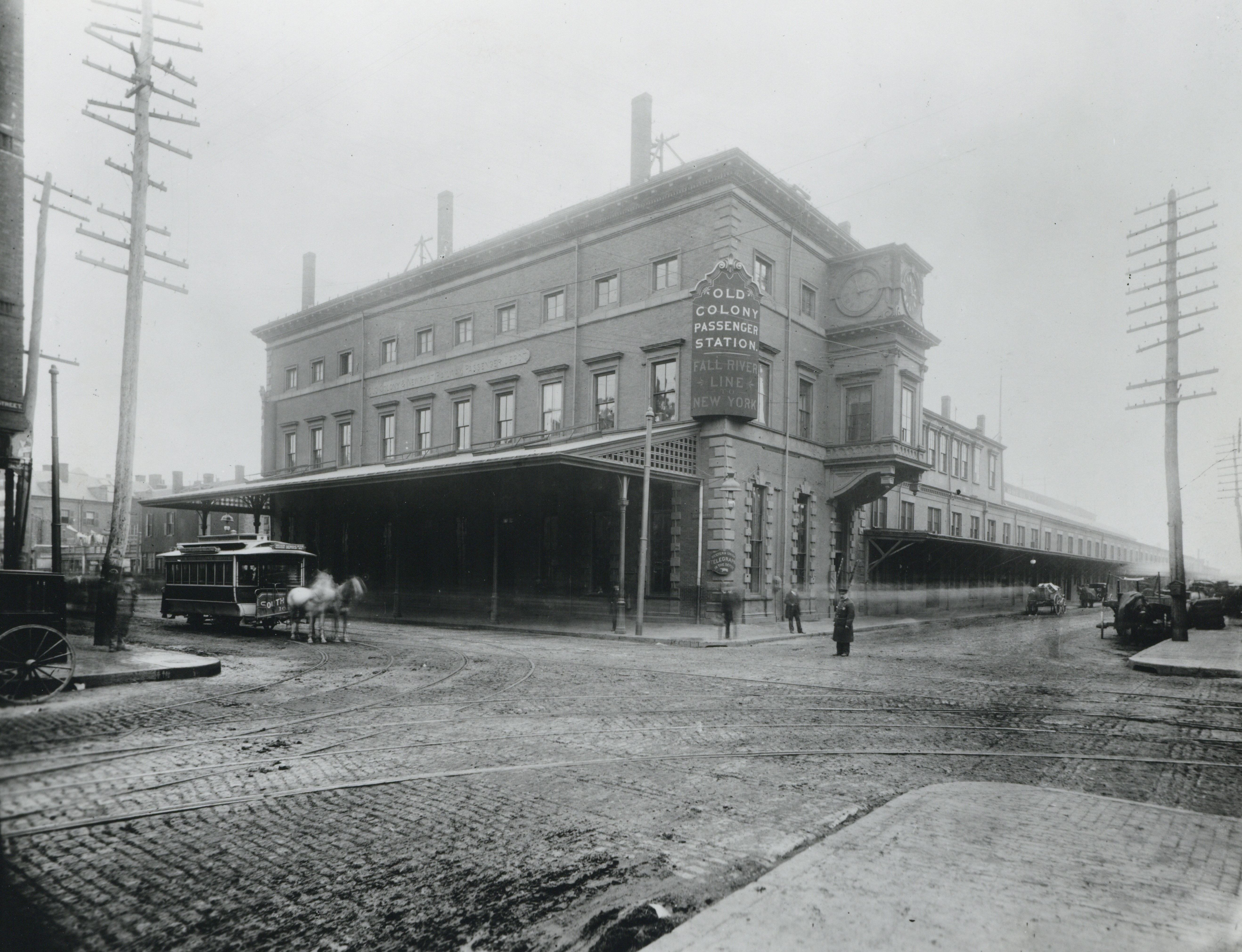
Old Colony Railroad terminal

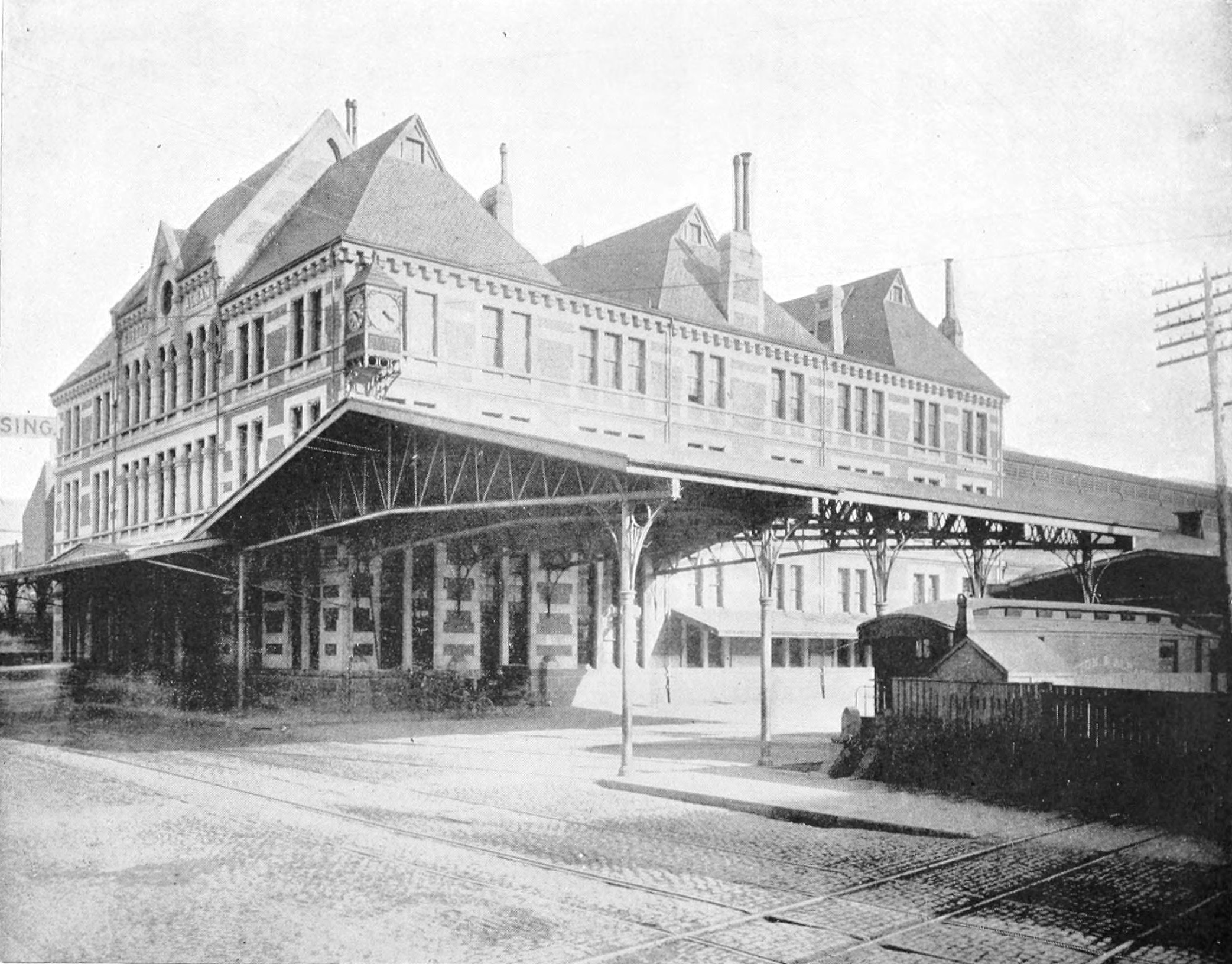
Boston and Albany Railroad terminal

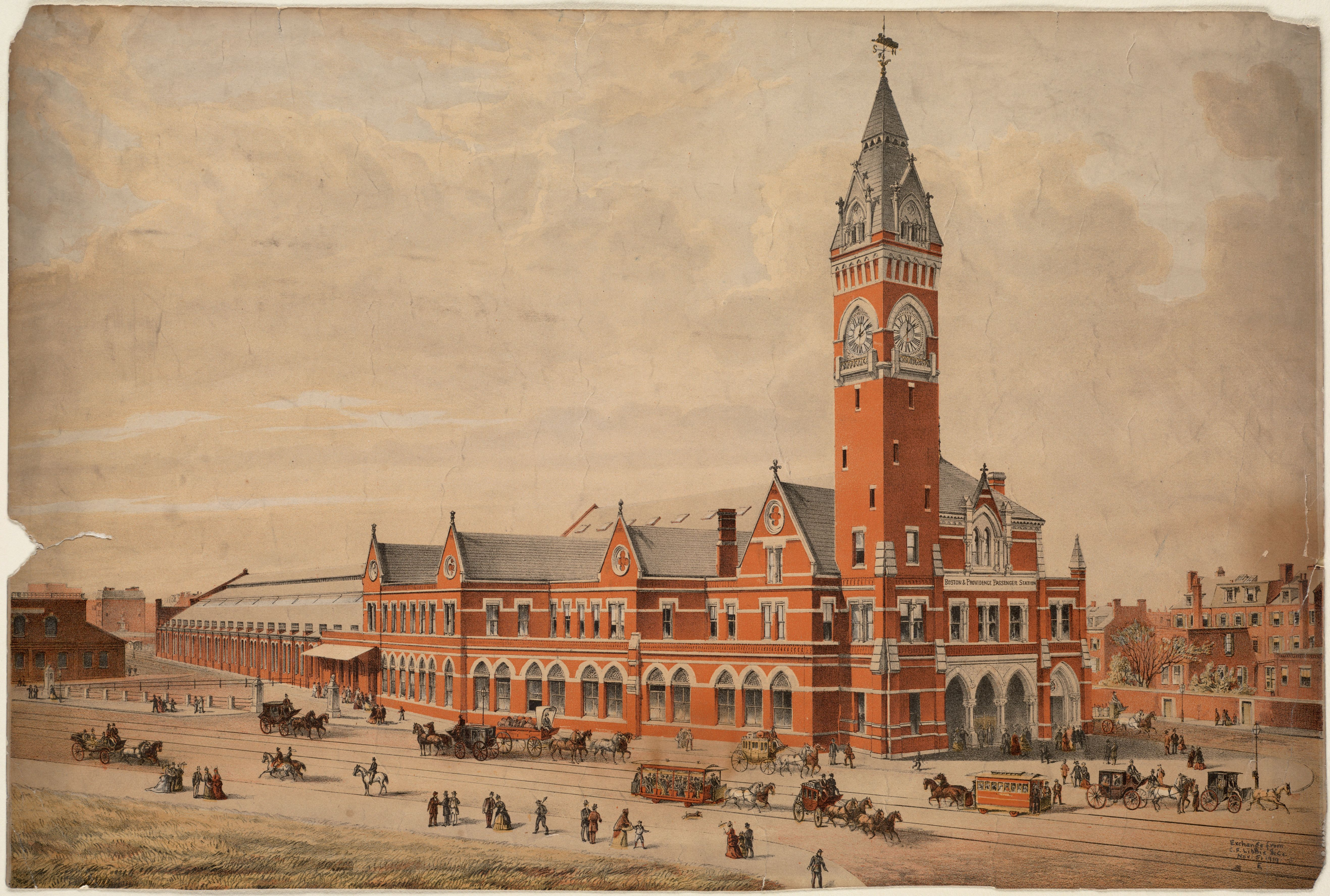
Boston and Providence Railroad terminal

=== Early years ===
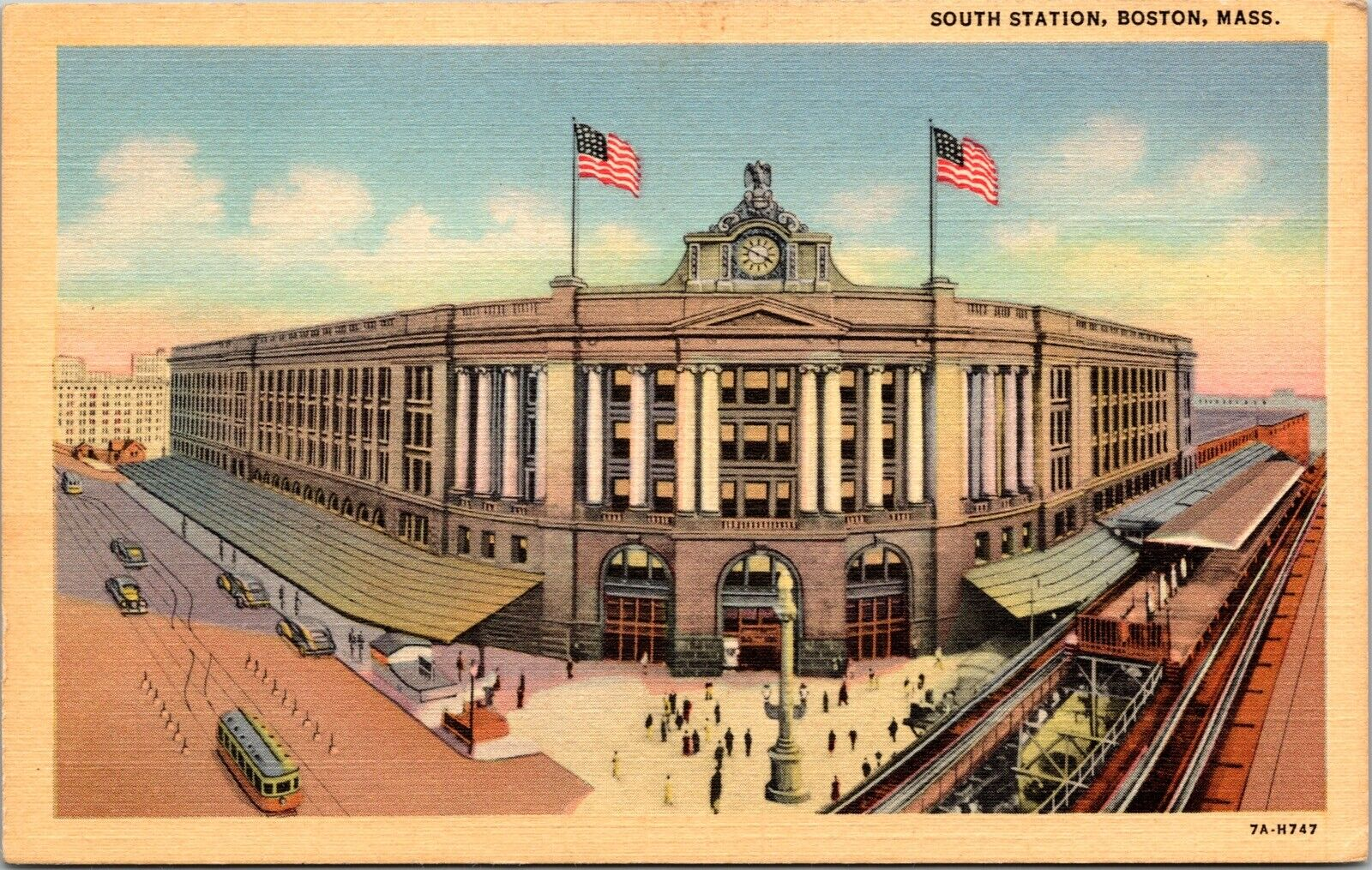
1930s view of the Atlantic Avenue Elevated in front of South Station

South Station opened in 1899 at a cost of $3.6 million (equivalent to $114 million in 2024). The architects were Shepley, Rutan and Coolidge of Boston, and the construction was undertaken by the engineering firm of Westinghouse, Church, Kerr & Co. The station opened on January 1 for use by Old Colony Division and Midland Division trains, the latter of which had been using the Old Colony terminal since August 22, 1896 to allow for construction. B&A trains began using South Station on July 23, followed by Providence Division trains on September 10 (along with the opening of Back Bay station).

At its peak the station had 28 tracks used for passenger service. It became the busiest station in New England by 1913. A stop on the Atlantic Avenue Elevated served South Station from 1901 to 1938; what is now the Red Line subway was extended from Washington to South Station in 1916. The train shed, originally one of the largest in the world, was eliminated in a 1930 renovation due to corrosion caused by the nearby ocean's salt air.

In the original configuration, two tracks came off each approach to join into a four-track line and then run under the main platforms in a two-track loop. These tracks were never put into service, and later became a parking lot and bowling alley for employees. (The tunnel has since been removed.)

While the station handled 125,000 passengers each day during World War II, post-war passenger rail traffic declined in the US. In 1959, the New Haven's Old Colony Division–successor of the Old Colony Railroad–which had served the South Shore and Cape Cod, stopped passenger service. The New Haven itself went bankrupt in 1961. South Station was sold to the Boston Redevelopment Authority (BRA) in 1965.

The United States Postal Service originally had Mail Express Terminals on Atlantic Avenue, reached by angled tracks. By 1966, this was replaced by a larger Boston South Postal Annex where some of the passenger tracks were. A second expansion later in the 1960s converted the postal annex from rail to truck for long-distance transport. The USPS put loading docks facing a block of Dorchester Avenue, which it purchased from the city to avoid traffic conflicts.

In 1975, unused portions of the station were demolished and replaced with a new modernist building at 245 Summer Street, to serve as headquarters for engineering firm Stone and Webster. Today, that building is occupied by Fidelity Investments.

In the early 1970s, the BRA developed plans to demolish the rest of the station and replace it with a multi-use development including a new train station, a bus station, a parking garage, and commercial structures. The plan was never realized, and South Station was added to the National Register of Historic Places in 1975.

=== Renovations ===
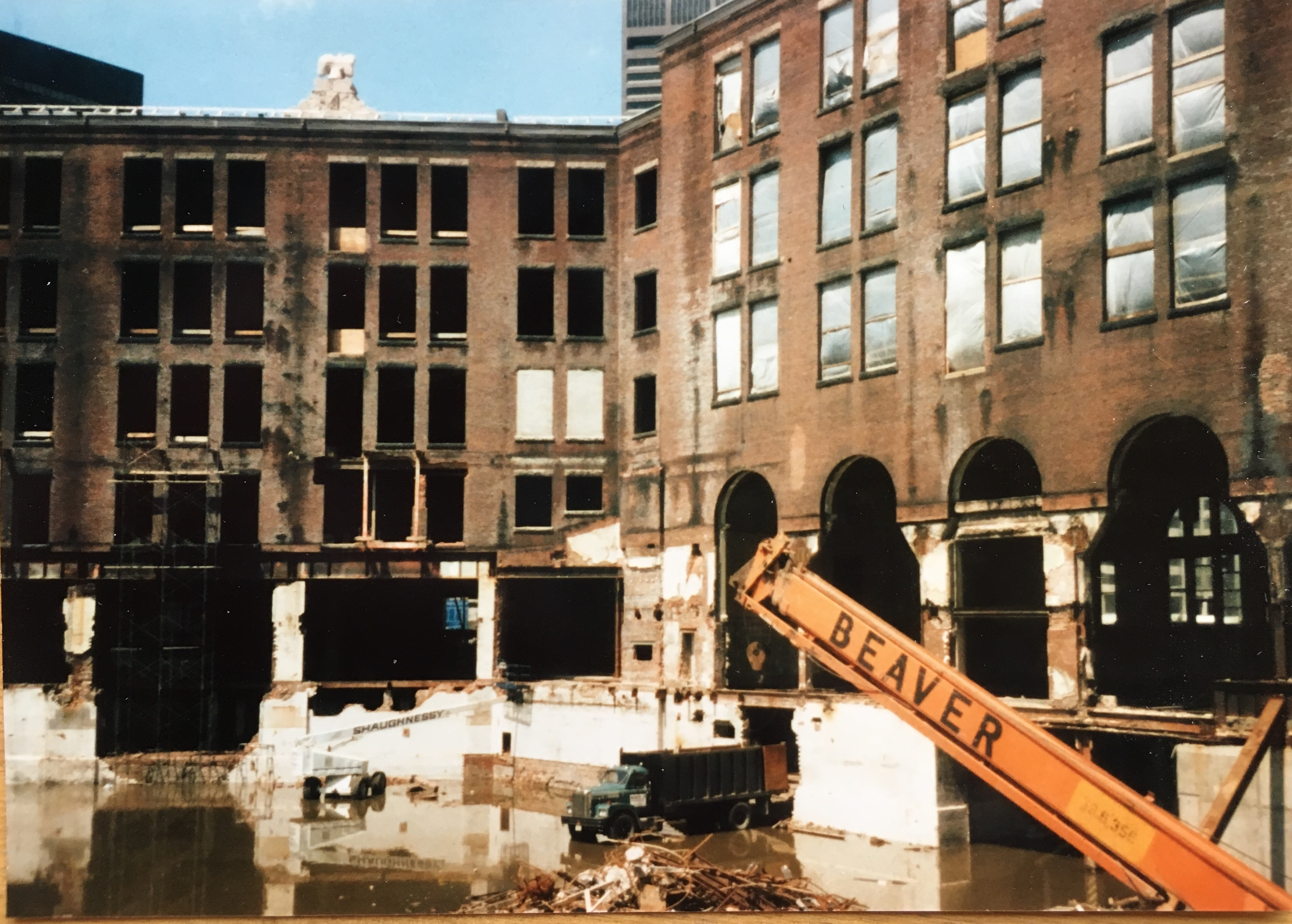
South Station in 1985 during reconstruction

In 1978, the BRA sold what was left of the station to the MBTA, though the BRA retained air rights over the station. Funding was obtained for a major renovation of the station that was completed in 1989. A total of 13 tracks became available, all with high level platforms and some capable of handling 12-car trains. Piers were installed for the eventual construction of an office building and bus station above the tracks. This renovation also added direct access to the Red Line subway station from inside the surface station lobby; previously, the only access was via street stairwells. The Central Artery/Tunnel Project (Big Dig) occupied almost all of the building's office space beginning in July 1988.

In 1988 the MBTA entered into a ground lease for the interior concourse and office space areas, transferring management of those spaces to Beacon South Station Associates. The lease split the revenue from the station between the MBTA and Beacon South Station Associates, in exchange Beacon financed the renovation and upkeep of the building. Beacon South Station Associates was acquired by EQ Office in 1997, which was itself acquired by the Blackstone Group in 2007.

After some delays, an inter-city bus terminal opened in October 1995, replacing one on top of the I-93 Dewey Square Tunnel diagonally across from the station between Summer Street and Congress Street. The new bus terminal has direct ramp connections to I-93 and the Massachusetts Turnpike. The renovations, including the bus terminal, cost $195 million in 2001 dollars.

In September 2017, the Ashkenazy Acquisition Corporation, which also owned the Faneuil Hall Marketplace, purchased the 98-year lease on the office space and concourse areas of the station from the Blackstone Group for $123.2 million. The MBTA began installation of fare gates for the commuter rail and Amtrak platforms in September 2025. The fare gates were put in use on December 30, 2025. By September 2026, the fare gates were out of service about 10% of the time. A "wind tunnel" effect created by the arched concourse caused outside precipitation to reach and affect the gates.

In August 2019, the Federal Railroad Administration awarded MassDOT up to $41.2 million to replace much of the Tower 1 interlocking outside South Station. The remaining $41 million of the $82 million project will be funded by Amtrak and the MBTA. As of January 2021, completion is expected in 2026. Bidding for the $68.7 million main construction contract opened in September 2022. The MBTA awarded the contract at a higher cost of $99 million in March 2023.

=== South Station Tower ===
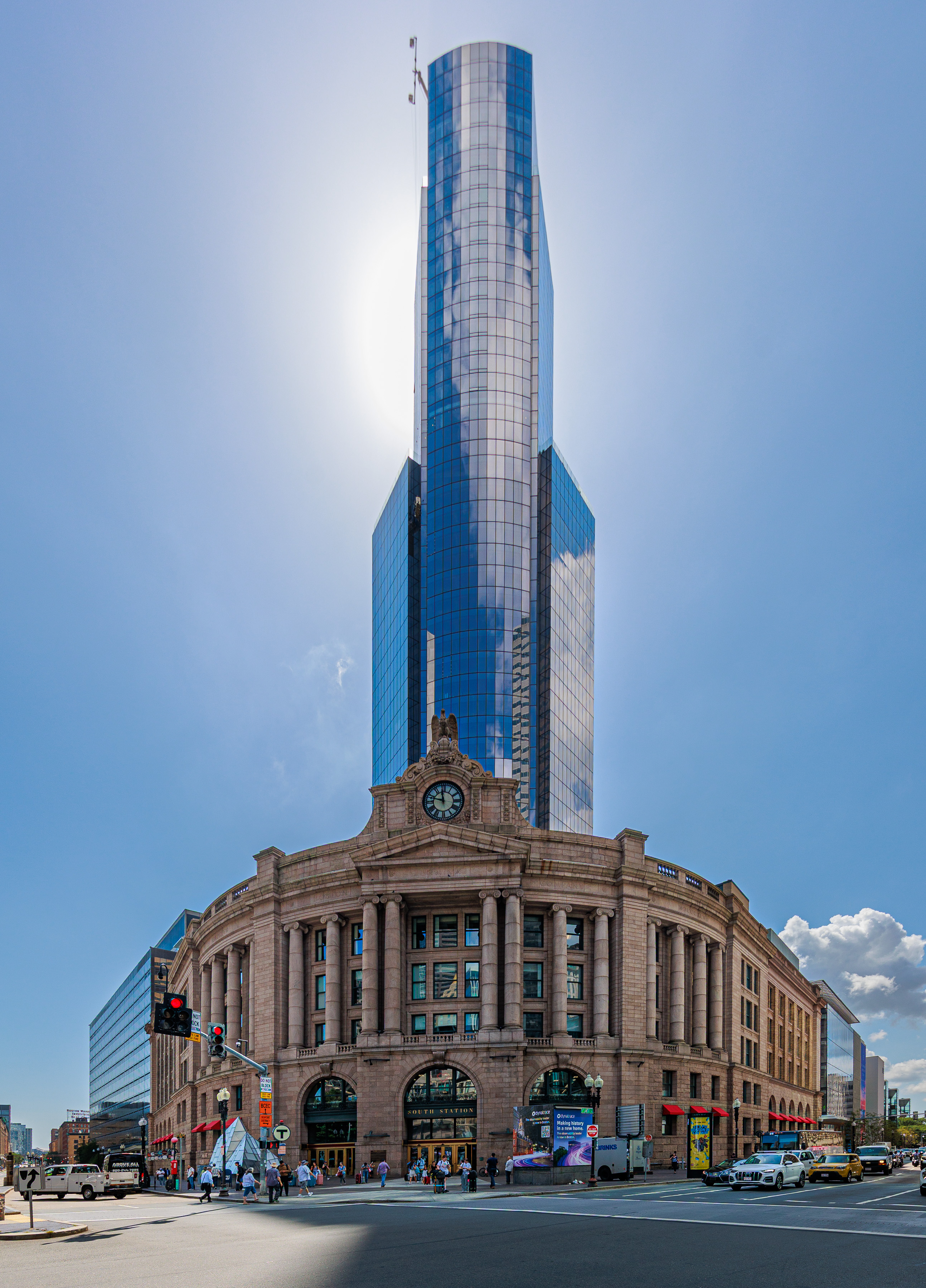
The nearly-complete South Station Tower in August 2025

When the Boston Redevelopment Authority sold South Station to the MBTA in 1977, the BRA retained the air rights over the tracks. The South Station Tower complex, which is being built on the air rights, will include a 51-story, 678-foot (207 m) skyscraper and an expansion of the bus terminal. Construction began in January 2020 and was expected to take four years. The tower is being built on foundations put in place when the station was last renovated. The project will include an expansion of the outdoor waiting area with a new arched roof, a roof covering the entire platform area, a new entrance from Dorchester Avenue, and a more direct connection to the bus terminal.

=== Proposed expansion ===
As a major transfer station offering connections to multiple modes, South Station is expected to see additional passenger throughput as a result of system improvements and a general increase in ridership. The existing underground Red Line and Silver Line stations are adequate for the near future, but the surface-level commuter rail and Amtrak platforms are at capacity.

A proposed relocation of the Boston General Mail Facility, which is located on Dorchester Avenue next to the station tracks, would allow for increased capacity at South Station. Seven more tracks are planned to be added to the existing thirteen tracks, allowing increased use by both MBTA Commuter Rail and Amtrak trains.

In October 2010, the Commonwealth of Massachusetts was awarded a $32.5 million grant from the federal government to begin planning for this expansion. After deliberations, a $43 million contract (including $10.5 million in state funds) was awarded in August 2012. The planning project will advance the new station area, including a possible passenger mezzanine over the platforms, to the 30% design level. Other elements include a redesign of the South Station interlocking, new commuter rail layover facilities, and the restoration of public access to the adjacent section of Dorchester Avenue and the Fort Point Channel, filling in a missing half-mile segment of the Boston Harborwalk. The station expansion is intended to allow for increases in commuter rail service on the Fairmount Line and Framingham/Worcester Line, addition of South Coast Rail service, and increased Amtrak frequencies.

As of October 2014, purchasing of the postal facility is in limbo, as the Postal Service is not willing to accept the amount offered by the state. Part of this deal would include moving the facility to South Boston, with MassPort taking some of the Post Office's parking lot located across Fort Point Channel.

The Final Environmental Impact Report for the South Station Expansion Project was released on June 30, 2016. The project would begin with the demolition of the postal facility and take 5 years to complete. The Massachusetts Executive Office of Energy and Environmental Affairs approved the FEIR on August 12, 2016.

The South Station Expansion Project has been opposed by a number of transportation advocates, community groups, and environmental groups, many of which instead advocate building a North–South Rail Link (NSRL) through connection to North Station and points beyond, rather than expanding the dead-end storage capacity for trains at South Station. Prominent NSRL supporters include former Governor Michael S. Dukakis (Democrat) and former Governor William F. Weld (Republican), who have made joint public appearances regarding this issue. Based on their advocacy, MassDOT agreed to fund a $2 million study in February 2016. The NSRL reevaluation report was released in June 2018. Its tunnel options included a four-track maximum-service plan, estimated to cost $21.5 billion and three double-track routes ranging in cost from $12.3 to 14.7 billion. South Station expansion was estimated to cost $4.7 billion. These costs are in 2018 dollars and include purchasing additional rolling stock, other required infrastructure improvements and a 3.5% annual inflation rate.
