= South Station Tower =

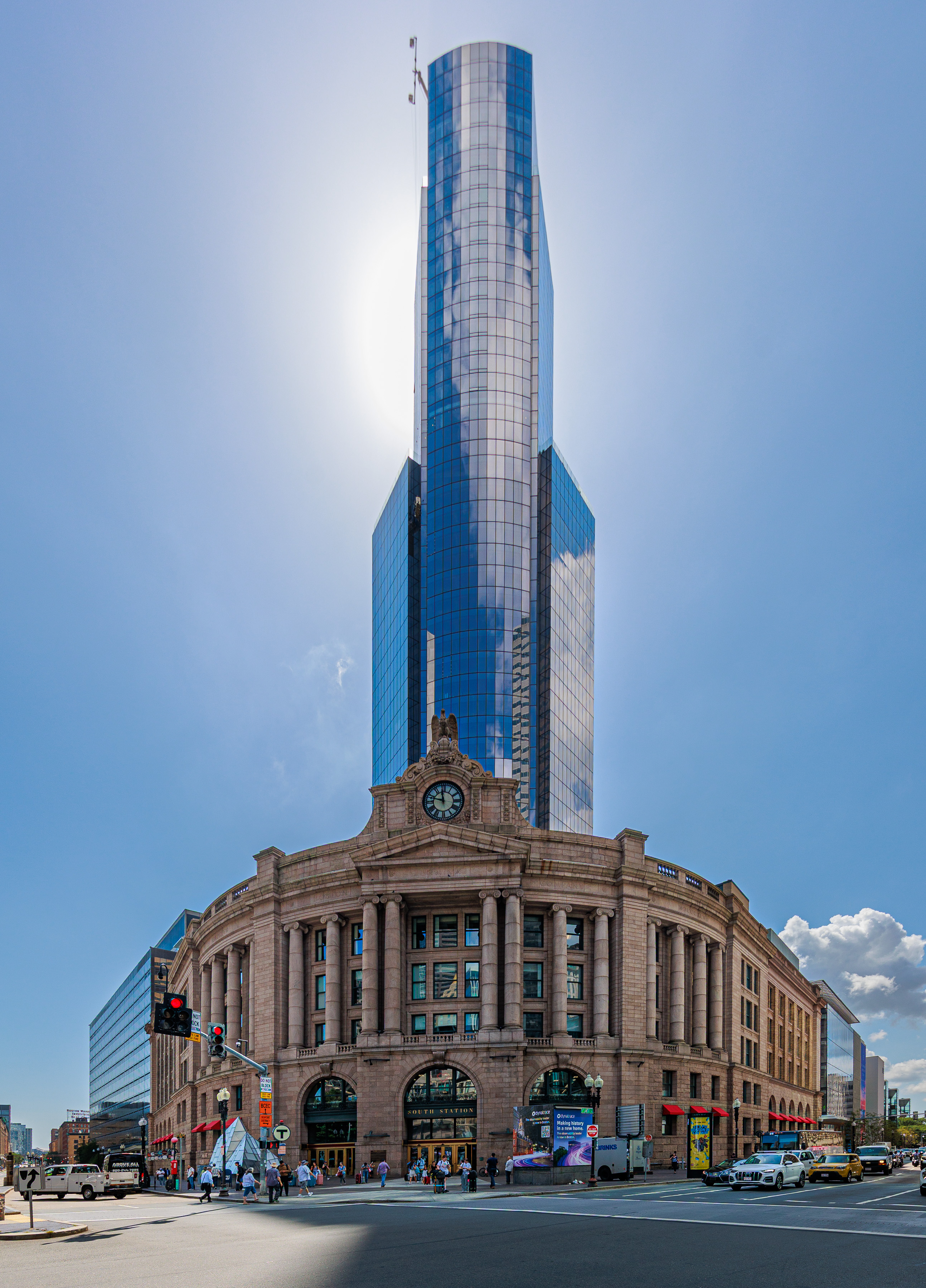
- The nearly-complete tower in August 2025

General information
- Status: Completed
- Type: Office, residential
- Location: Atlantic Avenue, Boston, Massachusetts, United States
- Coordinates: 42°21′06″N 71°03′18″W
- Construction started: January 2020
- Completed: September 2025

Height
- Architectural: 677 ft (206 m)
- Roof: 677 ft (206 m)

Technical details
- Floor count: 51

Design and construction
- Architect: César Pelli
- Developer: Hines Interests

Website
- southstationtower.com

South Station Tower is a skyscraper in Boston, Massachusetts, the high-rise portion of a three-building development built on top of Boston's historic South Station complex. Construction on Phase 1 of the project, a 51-story, 678-foot tower with offices and condominiums, started in January 2020 and finished in September 2025. Upon completion, South Station Tower became the sixth-tallest building in Boston. It is an example of transit-oriented development. The overall project includes condominium units, office space, a parking structure, and possibly hotel space.

== Architecture ==
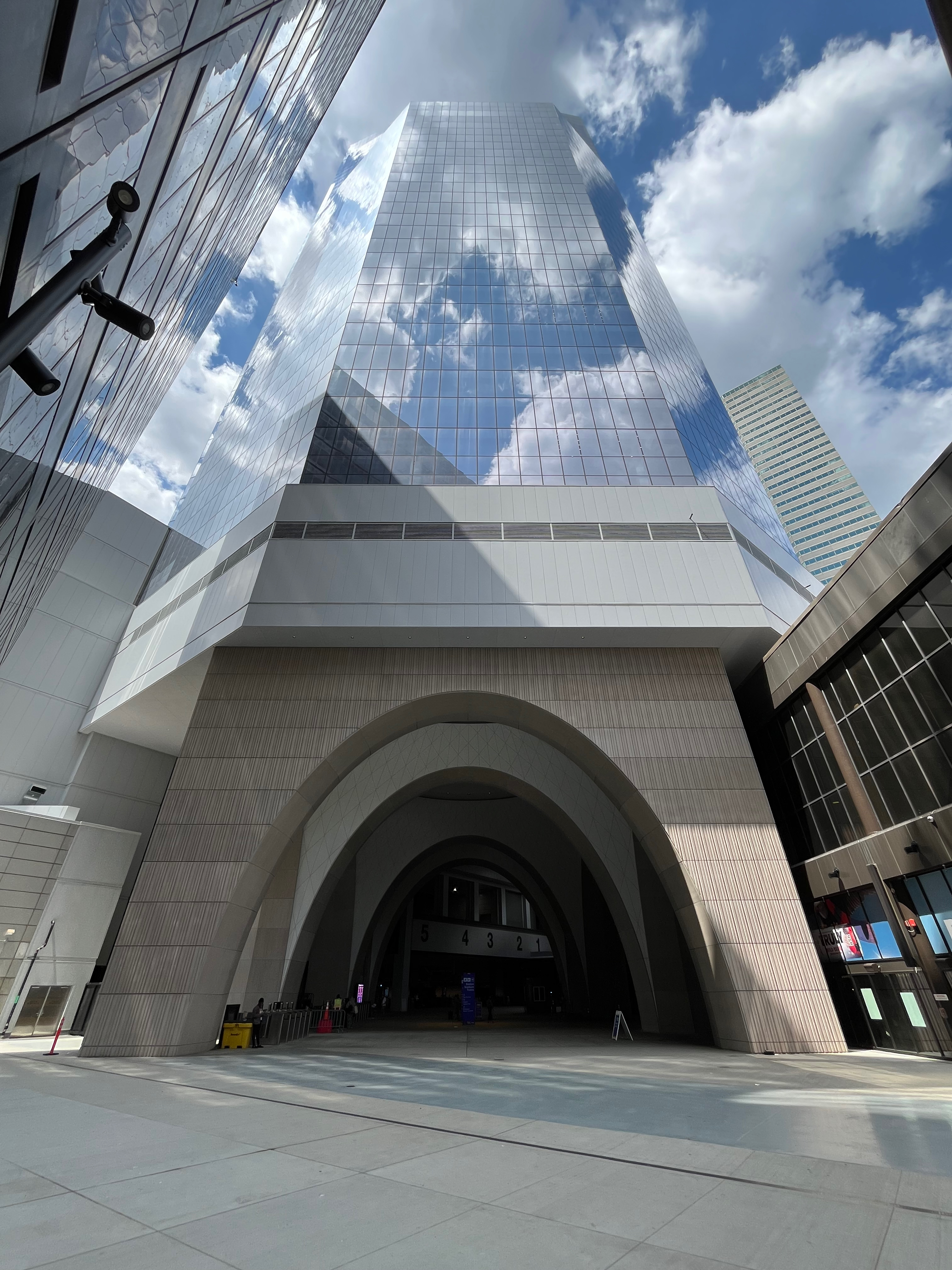
The tower's arched base structure, through which travelers can walk between South Station's tracks (left) and atrium (right)

Preliminary design was done by architect Cesar Pelli, whose designs are reminiscent of his Wells Fargo Center in Minneapolis. The structure has been LEED pre-certified "silver" and won the EPA's "Green design" award.

The tower does not actually touch the South Station building, but occupies the space between the station's tracks and atrium. To provide space for pedestrians, the tower is built atop an arched base structure anchored by eight columns. Loads are transferred via diagonal struts from the tower's exterior to its concrete core, and are then distributed to the eight columns.

Part of the tower is cantilevered over the station atrium. The lobby has views of a one-acre sky park on the 11th floor. The building has about 680,000 square feet (63,000 m^{2}) of office space and 166 Ritz-Carlton-branded condominium residences on the 36th floor and higher.

Another part of Phase I, an expanded bus station, uses a foundation put in place when the station was last renovated in the late 1980s.

== History ==
=== Planning ===
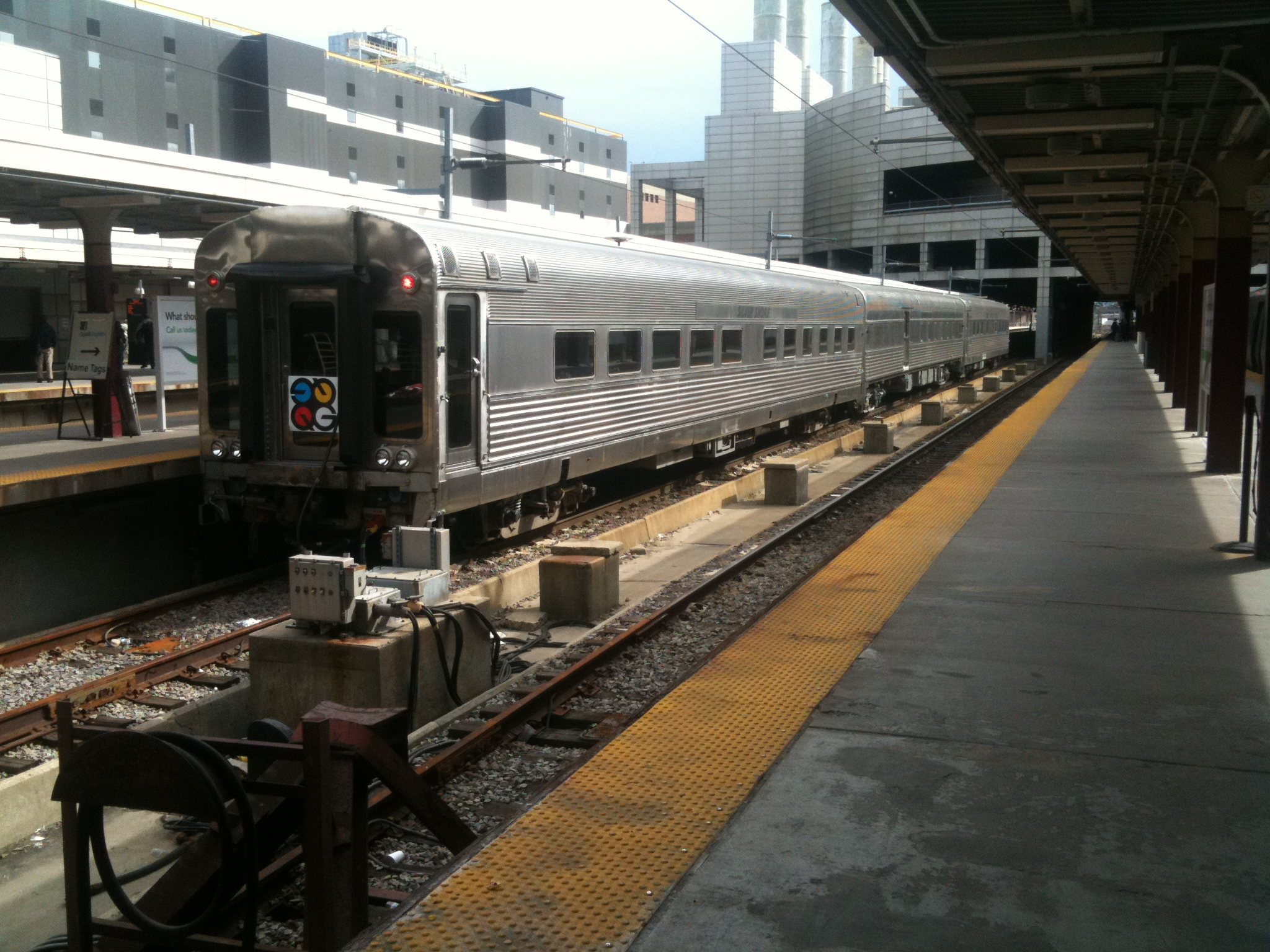
Foundation piers were installed between tracks during the 1980s reconstruction of South Station, which were later used to support the bus station expansion.

Foundation piers for a future high-rise building, with posts spaced 35 feet (11 m) apart, were installed between each pair of tracks during the 1980s reconstruction of South Station. These would eventually support the bus station expansion.

The building was conceived by Tufts University president Jean Mayer, who foresaw an "epicenter of high-profile medical research" in downtown Boston. In 1991, Tufts created a for-profit development subsidiary, TUDC LLC, and acquired the rights to the airspace. Development was complicated by Boston waterfront zoning restrictions, which require pedestrian access to the waterfront. In 1997, TUDC brought on Hines Interests LP as a development partner. In 2006, TUDC and Hines filed a Development Plan for the project. South Station Tower was originally designed with a height of 759 feet (231 m), which included a decorative spire. However, the project was downscaled in 2006.

Approval was obtained by 2008 for a project totaling 2,190,000 square feet (203,000 m^{2}), and South Station Tower was planned to break ground in 2008, with completion scheduled to occur in 2010, but the project stalled. Questions were raised in 2007 about the university's role in the project, and Tufts withdrew in 2009.

As of March 2016 the developer's website was updated stating the tower would begin construction early in 2017; the FAA had given approval in February for a tower reaching 677 feet (206 m)}. The developer's rights to build on the site were scheduled to expire in April 2017, but the state extended them until the end of the year. Construction was halted due to Massachusetts Bay Transportation Authority (MBTA)'s concerns, but Hines did not stop the project.

In July 2016, the developer filed a "Notice of Project Change" with the Boston Planning and Development Agency (BPDA), proposing a number of changes in the project, including the addition of more residential space. The notice included a timeline calling for construction of the project's first building, the high-rise tower, to begin in 2017. In December 2016, the board of the BPDA approved construction of the project. It was delayed until December 2017, then delayed again in 2018 due to MBTA concerns on the tower's potential operational and maintenance cost, in addition to its capital expenditure and the way it was distributed among the project stakeholders. In October that year, MBTA extended the negotiation period with Hines until April 2019.

=== Construction ===
Construction officially began in January 2020, with a five year completion timeline. By November 2022, ENR East reported that the building's steel frame had reached a height of 109 feet (33 m). Construction was completed in September 2025.

On March 21, 2024, a steel beam fell from the top of the tower, damaging several windows, before coming to rest on the ninth floor. Some equipment from the worksite also fell, landing at street-level. The MBTA, which owns South Station and the South Station Bus Terminal, suspended commuter services and ordered work to halt in the time after the incident. No injuries were reported, but construction company Suffolk agreed to pause work while investigations proceeded. Construction work resumed on March 27, 2024, following the conclusion of the stop-work order and subsequent investigations by OSHA.

On April 9, 2024, a few weeks after the beam fell, a fire was started outside the ninth floor by welders. The fire was quickly put out and the site was again shut down for a safety review. Work on the site was then continued on April 10, 2024.

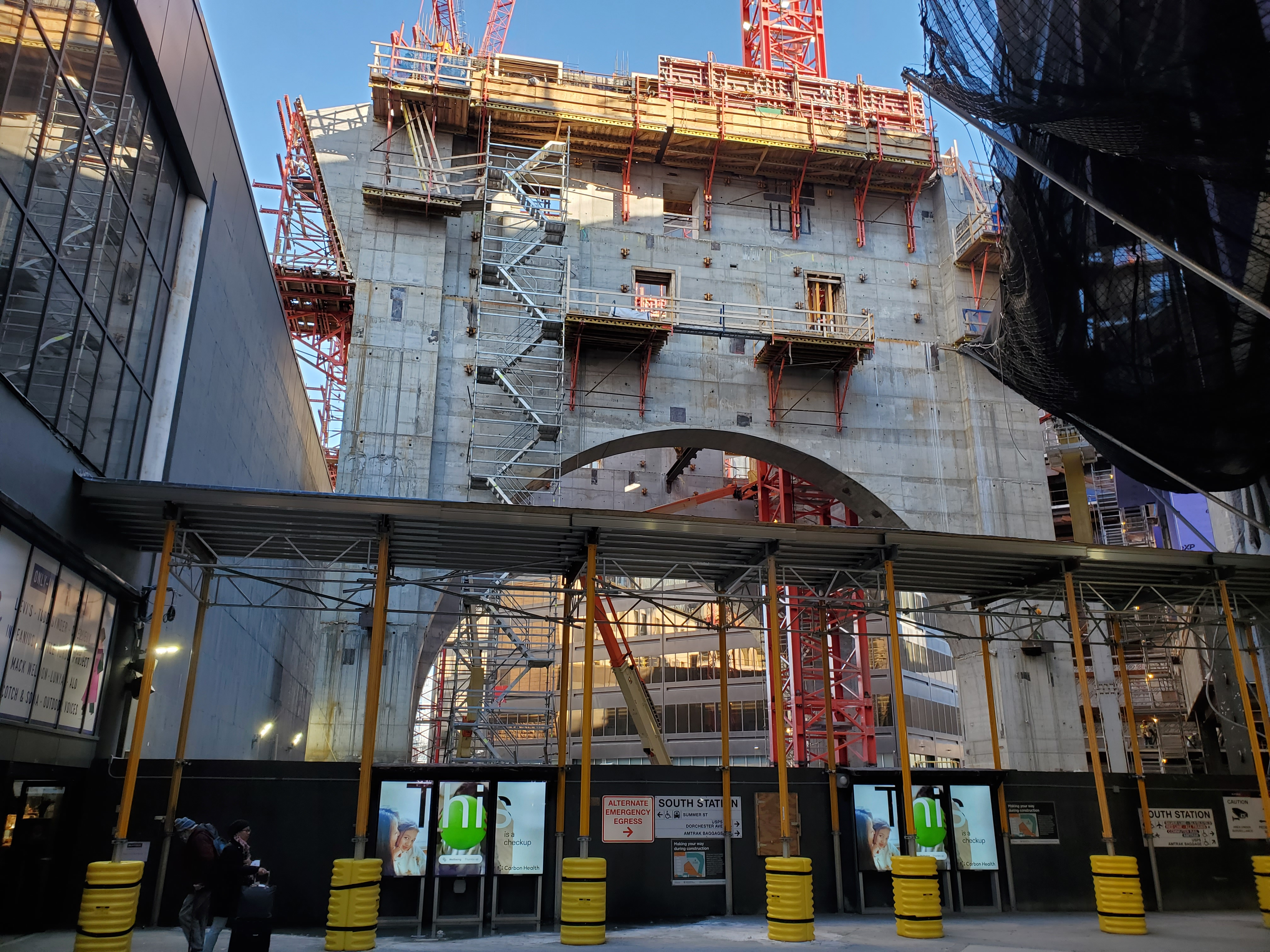
Construction of the arched base in December 2022

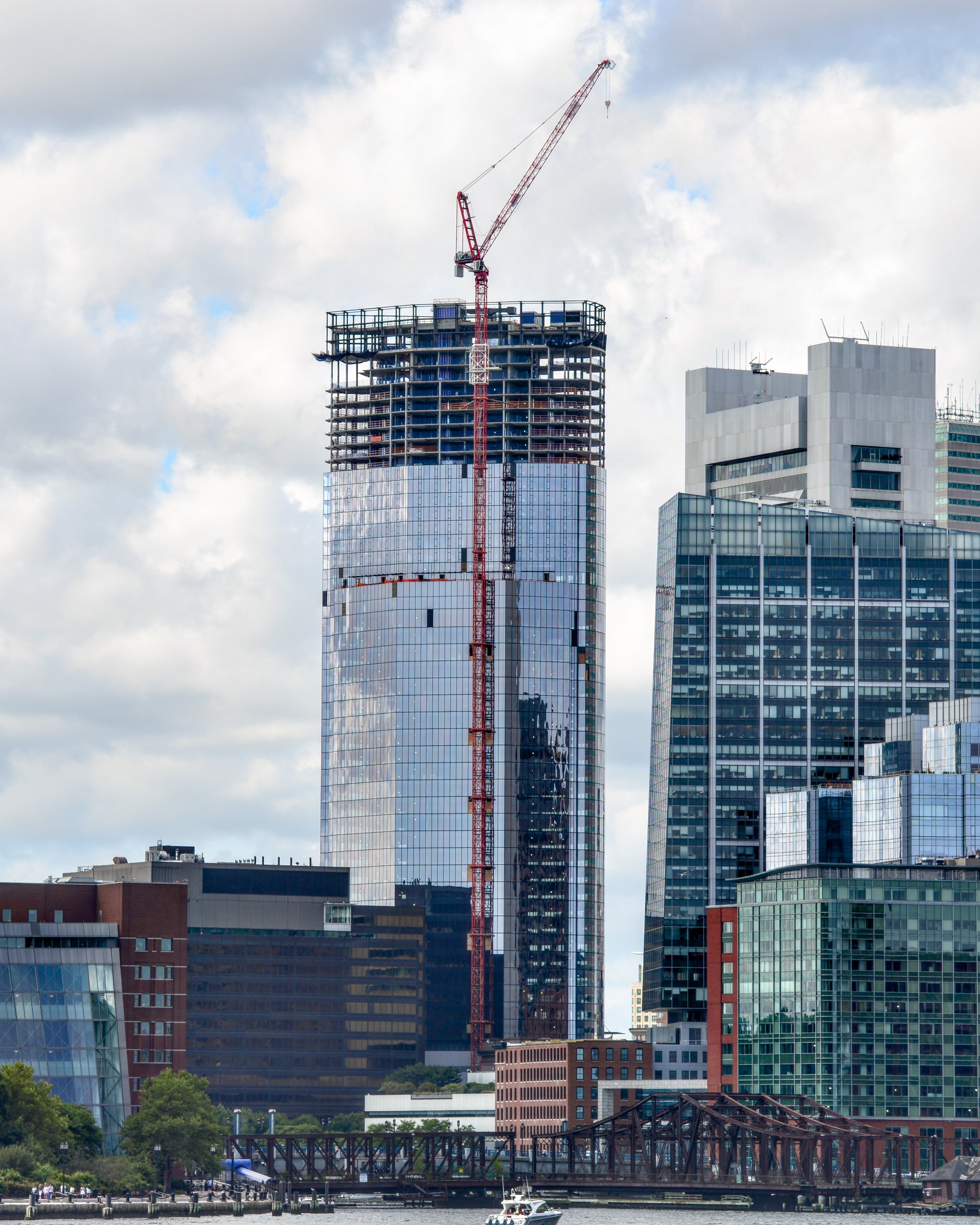
The glass curtain wall going up in August 2024

== See also ==
- List of tallest buildings in Boston
