= Killing of José Campos Torres =

American killing in police custody

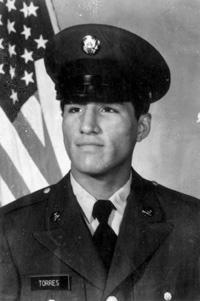
- U.S. Army photo of Torres
- Date: May 5, 1977
- Type: Police brutality; killing by beating and blunt force trauma
- Participants: 6 Houston Police officers
- Deaths: José Campos Torres
- Accused: Terry W. Denson; Stephen Orlando; Joseph Janish
- Charges: State charges: Murder (Denson, Orlando); Federal charges: Deprivation of civil rights resulting in death (Denson, Orlando, Janish)
- Convictions: Denson, Orlando: Negligent homicide (state); Deprivation of civil rights resulting in death (federal); Janish: Deprivation of civil rights resulting in death (federal)
- Sentence: Denson, Orlando: 1 year probation + one-dollar fine (state); 9 months imprisonment (federal); Janish: 9 months imprisonment (federal)

José "Joe" Campos Torres (December 20, 1953 – May 5, 1977) was a 23-year-old Mexican-American and veteran who was beaten by several Houston Police Department (HPD) officers, which subsequently led to his death. He had been brutally assaulted by a group of on-duty police officers on May 5, 1977, after being arrested for disorderly conduct at a bar in Houston's Mexican-American East End neighborhood.

After Torres' arrest at the bar, the officers took him to the city jail for booking, but his injuries were so extensive that a supervisor instead ordered the officers to take Torres to a local hospital for immediate medical treatment. The officers did not comply with the order, and three days later, his severely beaten dead body was found floating in Buffalo Bayou, near the 1200 block of Commerce St., in downtown Houston.

Following the discovery of Torres' body, two of the arresting officers, Terry W. Denson and Stephen Orlando, were charged with murder. Three other officers were fired from the HPD by Police Chief B.G. Bond, but no criminal charges were brought against them. A rookie officer who was present at the scenes of Torres' torture and drowning was a key witness for the prosecution. On October 7, 1977, Denson and Orlando were found guilty of negligent homicide (a misdemeanor) by an all-white jury. The judge subsequently sentenced the officers to one year's probation and a one dollar fine.

The racial composition of the jury, the limited criminal charges and the lenient sentencing sparked community outrage, leading to multiple protests and the 1978 Moody Park Riot. His death led to negotiations between advocacy-based non-profits and HPD officials, which resulted in the addition of policies that addressed police-community racial relations.

Following the State of Texas' controversial convictions of the two former officers, the Torres case was reviewed at the federal level by the U.S. Department of Justice, which led to three of the officers' federal convictions for violating Torres' civil rights.

Torres' killing generated significant newspaper coverage across the United States. Initially, it focused on his assault and drowning, but soon it turned its attention to the historic racism, lack of HPD over-watch and the recurring absence of state and federal investigations. Later, a locally produced documentary appeared, entitled The Case of Joe Campos Torres, which focused on the history of police misconduct in Houston. In the year following his death, a poetic song by vocalist and activist Gil Scott-Heron appeared, titled "Poem for José Campos Torres", reflecting the struggles surrounding racism and police brutality.

On Saturday April 2, 2022, the city of Houston unveiled the Joe Campos Torres Memorial Plaza and trail along Buffalo Bayou. It is meant to remember the life of Torres and the impact his killing had on his family and the community. Mayor of Houston Sylvester Turner said of the memorial "Mr. Campos Torres was brutally murdered in 1977. Nothing we do will bring him back to his loved ones. The monument will send a message; his life mattered, and our city will never let something like this happen again." Shawn Carreon, Torres' nephew, was quoted as well saying "Today is just to celebrate my uncle, Joe Campos Torres. My moms [sic] brother. I know she's been hurting and my grandmother has been hurting for the longest time, but now they can finally have some peace,"

== Background ==
José Campos Torres was born to José Luna Torres Jr. in a poor family of Mexican descent. The family resided in a barrio in Houston, Texas. Torres achieved only an eighth-grade education. It is believed that a side effect of the poverty he experienced is what led to his constant struggle with his social demeanor.

According to family and friends, Torres' dream was to run and own a karate school. He wanted to open the school near his East End neighborhood, allowing him to teach young people the art of self-defense. To pursue his dream, he realized that he needed a General Education Diploma (GED), a driver's license, and a job, preferably as a lineman with a telephone company.

Richard Vargas, Torres' longtime friend, said that when Torres was 23 years old, he still felt emotionally lost, and was fighting a sporadic problem with alcohol. Torres would occasionally become very intoxicated, and his friends and family said that it was this that would trigger his aggression, in wanting to fight. Torres' younger brothers, Gilbert, 20 and Ray, 16 acknowledged that Torres had an occasional problem with alcohol abuse. "Alcohol really got to him sometimes." Vargas said, "Sometimes when he drank a lot he wanted to fight ... I didn't like to be around Joe when he was drinking. When he got drunk, he'd start practicing his karate. He'd yell and kick and punch at the air." When Torres was a teenager he got into a lot of fights, and yet he had confided to Vargas that he knew that the fighting would get him nowhere.

Torres' father said that his son spent two years in the United States Army. During his military service, he was accepted to the United States Army Rangers, undergoing training at Fort Bragg in North Carolina. While in training, he was separated from the service in September 1976, under a 'general discharge.' It was reported that his abuse of alcohol and anger outbursts are what ultimately led to his early release from the U.S. Army. His brother Gilbert said, "Before the service, Joe was bum and a drifter, but after he got out he really cut down on the drinking ... The normal Joe was different from the drunk Joe." He said, "The drunk Joe got rowdy easy and he [took] things the wrong way sometimes."

Just two weeks before his death, Torres found employment as a glass contractor, earning $2.75 an hour. Vargas said that Torres had difficulty staying employed ever since his discharge from the U.S. Army. He said that Torres resented his being restricted to tedious, low paying jobs due to his low education level and nominal military skills. Even though Torres had received training in the military as a telecommunications lineman, not having his GED and a driver's license were barriers to employment with a potential telecommunications provider.

Vargas said, Torres' true passions were physical fitness and the art of karate. After his return from the U.S. Army he was working to receive a black belt (expert) rating in karate. In addition to his progress in karate, he also underwent weight training and jogged, frequently attaching weights to his feet.

== Incident ==
Shortly before midnight on May 5, 1977, Torres was at the Club 21, a bar in Houston's predominantly Hispanic East End neighborhood, wearing his army fatigues and military boots. He had apparently been drinking, and police officers arrived, arresting him for disorderly conduct. The six officers who responded took Torres to "The Hole", a spot behind a warehouse overlooking Houston's Buffalo Bayou, and beat him there. The officers then took Torres to the city jail, who refused to process him due to his injuries. A supervisor ordered to take him to Ben Taub Hospital, but instead of doing so, the officers took him back to "The Hole", and pushed him off a wharf into the water. Torres's body was found three days later.

== Trials ==
Officers Terry W. Denson and Stephen Orlando were tried on state murder charges. They were convicted of negligent homicide and received one year of probation and a one dollar fine. In 1978, Denson, Orlando and fired officer Joseph Janish were subsequently convicted of federal civil rights violations, and served nine months in prison.

== Moody Park riot ==
1978 Moody Park riot
- Moody Park; Houston, Texas
- Date: May 7–8, 1978
- Location: Moody Park; Houston, Texas, U.S. 29.79231°N 95.36425°W
- Caused by: Reaction to light sentencing of police officers in the killing of Joe Campos Torres
- Goals: Civil rights • Ending police brutality • Ending police racism
- Methods: Arson • Assault • Looting • Rioting • Shooting • Property damage

Parties
Houston's Hispanic community	Law enforcement	News team (bystanders)

Number
approximately 1,500	Unknown	Unknown

Casualties and losses
8 injured	5 injured	2 injured

Casualties
- Death: 0
- Injuries: 15
- Arrested: 28
- Charged: 4
- "Free The Moody Park 3" legal fund started

On the one year anniversary of Torres' killing, a riot was started at Moody Park located in Houston's Near Northside neighborhood. The riot broke out on the evening of Sunday, May 7, 1978, at approximately 7:30 pm, once a Cinco de Mayo fiesta event ended at the park. Between five and six thousand people attended the celebration.

It was the greatest miscarriage of public trust by police officers in my 27 years of wearing a badge.

— Harry Robinson, Former Houston Police Chief, Houston History Magazine

Police arrived at the park in response to a call for an incident of disorderly conduct. It remains unclear on how the riot started. Some reports reflect that the officers were making a few arrests and this is when people in the event began yelling, "No you are not taking them" and "You'll kill them the way you killed José Campos Torres". The crowd's initial yelling immediately lead people to begin chanting in unison "Justice for Joe Torres" "Viva Joe Torres" and "A Chicano's life is worth more than a dollar!" The crowd then began throwing bottles and rocks at the officers.

The Fulton Village shopping center's stores at 2900 Fulton street, were looted and set on fire. Abe Weiner, an owner of a department store in the shopping center, said it took the fire department over an hour to respond to his emergency 9-1-1 call (this is incorrect as Houston did not have 911 service until 1986) for help. Three large buildings and two smaller ones in the shopping center were looted and stripped by fires. The rioting escalated to over a ten-block area adjacent to Moody Park. A total of six stores and one gasoline station were set on fire.

Officers were promptly deployed in riot gear to try and control the gathering of approximately 1,500 people according to police (other estimates reflect 150–300) who took part in the riot. Some rioters had flipped cars over and set them on fire, fourteen of the eighteen smashed and burned cars were police cars. The property damage of businesses and police vehicles reached $500,000. At least 28 people were taken into custody after the violence started in the predominantly Mexican-American neighborhood. The incident and all the fires were finally under control at 3:00 am.

Houston police officer Tommy A. Britt suffered a broken leg when hit by a car while trying to close off one of the streets involved in the riot. The driver Rogelio Castillo did not pull over, but was apprehended a few blocks away from the incident. The first news reporters to arrive at the scene were KPRC-TV reporter Jack Cato, and reporter/photographer Phil Archer. Both were beaten and stabbed. Cato suffered a punctured lung from a stab wound in the lower back. Archer was hit in the face with a brick and then stabbed in the left hip while lying unconscious on the pavement. Rioters attempted to smash the camera he was carrying. It was later recovered, badly damaged. Cato managed to bring out the video shot during the attack which shows some of the rioters surrounding a burning Houston Fire Department ambulance supervisor's car. The riot's violence left a total of five police officers, two news personnel and eight rioters injured and hospitalized. None of the fifteen hospitalized people died due to their injuries.

== Apology ==
In June 2021, police chief Troy Finner apologized to the Torres family, calling the killing "straight-up murder".

== Popular culture ==
=== Books ===
Author Dwight Watson dedicated the chapter "The Storm Clouds of Change: The Death of José Campos Torres and the Emergence of Triracial Politics in Houston" in the book Race and the Houston Police Department, 1930–1990 A Change Did Come. The chapter covers the impact of Torres' killing on society and on changes in Houston's policing policies.

It brought people who were very conservative and very quiet to become very vocal and very political and people began to hold the police accountable.

— Dwight Watson, "Moody Park–The Aftermath", interview by Houston Public Media

=== Music ===
External videos
- "Poem for José Campos Torres"

Vocalist and activist Gil Scott-Heron wrote a song "Poem for José Campos Torres" about the incident, in which he went so far as to refer to Torres as a brother:

But brother Torres, common ancient bloodline brother Torres is dead
I had said I wasn't going to write no more poems like this
I had said I wasn't going to write no more words down
About people kicking us when we're down
About racist dogs that attack us and drive us down, drag us down and beat us down
But the dogs are in the street

— Gil Scott-Heron, "Poem for José Campos Torres", Album: The Mind of Gil Scott-Heron

External audio
- "El Ballad De José Campos Torres" (0:53 - 5:29)

In March 2006, Charanga Cakewalk released the album Chicano Zen, whose closing song "El Ballad de José Campos Torres" is also inspired by the life of Torres.

So many people think of what happened to José Campos Torres, but I got [to] thinking about him as a person, who he was, what he felt, how he lived.

— Michael Ramos, The Zen of Revolution

=== Films ===
In 1977, Tony Bruni and KPRC-TV Channel 2 produced the documentary The Case of Joe Campos Torres, which depicted the series of events and the protest assemblies, community/police department discussions, and legal actions by the Torres family that followed the killing. The film notably utilized raw footage from local news station's archives, as a reminder to viewers that in a day before video cameras could bring police misconduct to light, the Torres family had to rely on community support to help them find justice.

== See also ==
- Death of Freddie Gray
- Death of John Hernandez
- Chad Holley
- Killing of Lorenzo Salgado Araujo
- Murder of Santos Rodriguez
- Wilmington Ten
- List of killings by law enforcement officers in the U.S.
- Police brutality in the United States
- Houston riot of 1917
- History of Mexican Americans in Houston
- Hispanics and Latinos in Houston
