= Northside High School (Houston) =

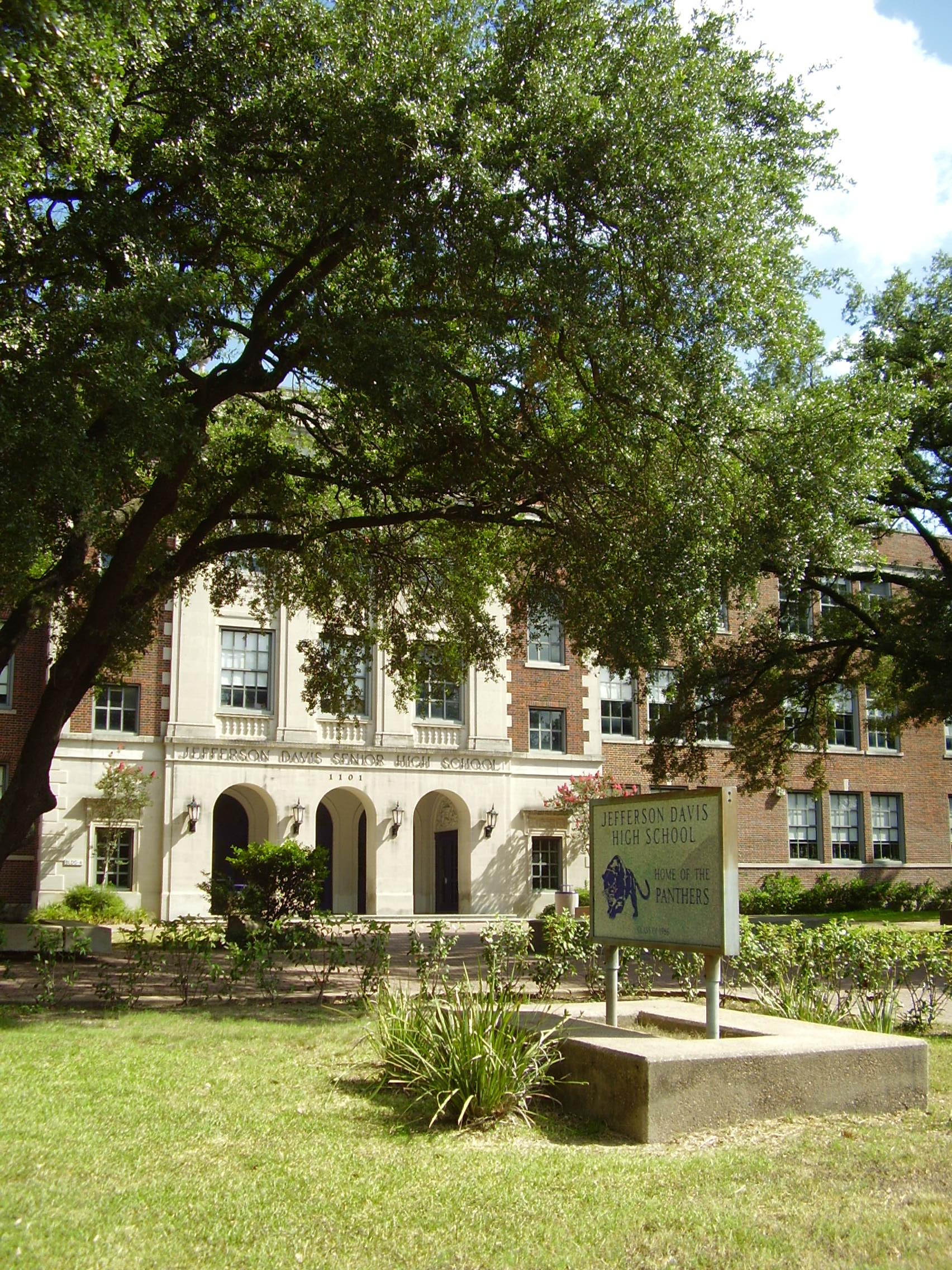
- The Quitman Street Courtyard view

Location
- 1101 Quitman Street; Houston, Texas 77009; United States; 29.78342°N 95.3585°W

Information
- Type: Public
- School district: Houston Independent School District (Houston ISD)
- Staff: 77.95 (FTE)
- Grades: 9–12
- Enrollment: 1,168 (2022-23)
- Student to teacher ratio: 14.98
- Campus: Urban
- Colors: Purple and gray
- Mascot: Panther
- Feeder schools: Gregory-Lincoln Education Center (K-8); Travis Elementary School; Others listed below
- Website: northside.houstonisd.org

Northside High School is a secondary school, serving Grades 9-12, located at 1101 Quitman in the Near Northside neighborhood of Northside, Houston, Texas, only two minutes from Downtown Houston. The school was previously named after Jefferson Davis, however, the HISD board voted to give the school its current name in 2016.

Northside HS school features a Magnet Program with three different career pathways: AV Production, Culinary Arts, and Hotel Management. In addition, students can earn an Associate Degree at Northside HS due to its extensive advanced course offerings including Houston City College Dual Credit, University of Texas at Austin OnRamps Dual Enrollment, and Advanced Placement (AP) classes. magnet program.

== History ==
Davis was previously reserved for white children but it desegregated by 1970, and white flight to the Houston suburbs began.

In 1993, project GRAD (Graduation Really Achieves Dreams) was founded at Davis High. The program provides scholarships to students as incentive to complete high school and enroll in college.

Prior to 1996 it was renovated through the Renewal A bond program, which spent $5.5 million on Davis. In 1996 it had 1,800 students.

== Campus ==
In 1996 the school had terrazzo floors. At the time it had one temporary building used for classes and two others for other purposes; it had a fewer number compared to some other schools because it was not overcrowded. In 1996 Terry Kliewer of the Houston Chronicle praised the building's features and maintenance, and stated that it "exemplifies what is possible when an old building gets good maintenance and timely remodeling."

== Neighborhoods served by Northside ==
Northside High School serves Near Northside, Northside Village, Irvington, Lindale Park, a portion of the Fifth Ward, and most of Downtown Houston.

The school serves Irvington Village, a public housing unit and Fulton Village, a mixed-income unit, both of the Houston Housing Authority. The school's boundary also includes the Four Seasons Hotel Houston residences, Houston House Apartments, One Park Place, and The Rice.

== Student body ==
At the end of the 2025-2026 school year, there were 867 students enrolled at Northside HS. 94% of the students qualify for free or reduced lunch.

- 87% Hispanic American
- 11% African American
- 1% White American
- 0.1% Asian American
- 0.0% Native American
- 0.1% Multiracial

== Extracurricular activities ==
The campus offers a variety of championship athletics

- Baseball
- Basketball
- Cross Country
- Football
- Flag Football
- Soccer
- Softball
- Swim Team
- Tennis
- Track
- Volleyball
- Water Polo
- Wrestling

The campus also offers a variety of fine arts:

- Art
- Band
- Choir
- Orchestra
- Mariachi
- Pantherettes Dance Team

== Feeder patterns ==
Elementary schools feeding into Northside HS include:

- Ketelsen
- Looscan
- Clemente Martinez
- Sherman

Partial:

- Crockett
- Gregory-Lincoln Education Center
- Herrera
- Jefferson
- Ross
- Travis

All of Marshall Middle School's attendance zone is within the Davis High School attendance zone.

Middle schools that have portions of their attendance boundaries zoned to Davis include:

- Burbank
- Fleming
- Gregory-Lincoln MS
- Key

== Notable alumni ==
- Frank Carswell - former Detroit Tigers outfielder and minor-league manager
- Carl Crawford - Major League Baseball outfielder 2002-16, 4-time All-Star
- James DeAnda - former federal judge of U.S. District Court for the Southern District of Texas
- Irma Galvan, owner of Irma's Original
- Gene Green - Democratic Party member of U.S. House of Representatives
- Ricardo "Rocky" Juarez - 1999 World Champion boxer and Olympic silver medalist
- Slater N. Martin - NBA Basketball player and Hall of Famer, played for Minneapolis Lakers (now Los Angeles Lakers), New York Knicks, and St. Louis Hawks (now Atlanta Hawks).
- Kenny Rogers - country singer
- Jesse Valdez - participant in 1972 Olympic Games
