= Ewing Werlein Jr. =

American judge (born 1936)

Senior Judge of the United States District Court for the Southern District of Texas
- Incumbent
- Assumed office January 1, 2006

Judge of the United States District Court for the Southern District of Texas
- In office April 13, 1992 – January 1, 2006
- Appointed by: George H. W. Bush
- Preceded by: Seat established by 104 Stat. 5089
- Succeeded by: Gray H. Miller

Personal details
- Born: September 14, 1936 (age 89) Houston, Texas, U.S.
- Education: Southern Methodist University (BA); University of Texas (LLB)

Ewing Werlein Jr. (born September 14, 1936) is a senior United States district judge of the United States District Court for the Southern District of Texas.

== Biography ==
Werlein was born in Houston. He received a Bachelor of Arts degree from Southern Methodist University in 1958 and a Bachelor of Laws from the University of Texas School of Law in 1961. He was in private practice in Houston in 1961, and then served as a first lieutenant Judge Advocate in the United States Air Force Judge Advocate General Corps from 1961 to 1964, continuing to serve as a United States Air Force Reserve captain from 1964 to 1971. He returned to private practice in Houston from 1964 to 1992.

=== Federal judicial service ===
Senator Phil Gramm recommended Werlein for nomination to the federal bench. On November 20, 1991, Werlein was nominated by President George H. W. Bush to a new seat on the United States District Court for the Southern District of Texas created by 104 Stat. 5089. He was confirmed by the United States Senate on April 8, 1992, and received his commission on April 13, 1992. He assumed senior status on January 1, 2006.

==== Important cases ====
- In 1995, Werlein declared a mistrial in the only trial resulting from a nineteenth-month FBI bribery investigation of NASA (all other defendants having pleaded guilty to charges). The case was dismissed after the jury deadlocked at 9 to 3 in favor of a conviction, unable to agree on the meaning of "entrapment".
- In 1996, Werlein presided over the trial of Juan García Abrego, a drug lord who was "once reportedly responsible for a third of the cocaine entering the United States". Abrego was convicted on multiple counts, and later sentenced by Werlein to 11 consecutive terms of life in prison.
- In 1997, Werlein reduced what was at the time "the largest libel verdict in history", a $222.7 million award against Dow Jones & Company, to $22.7 million.
- From 2004 to 2008, Werlein presided over the criminal prosecution of three British bankers implicated in the Enron scandal, culminating in their guilty pleas in 2007. On February 22, 2008, Werlein sentenced each defendant to 37 months in prison and told them they would have to redeem themselves and "pay[] back Royal Bank of Scotland every dollar or, over there, every pound."
- On October 20, 2010, Werlein blocked a request for the release of a videotape of an alleged beating of Chad Holley by five members of the Houston Police Department.

Legal offices
Preceded by Seat established by 104 Stat. 5089	Judge of the United States District Court for the Southern District of Texas; 1992–2006	Succeeded by Gray H. Miller
