= Lindale Park, Houston =

Neighborhood in Houston, Texas

Coordinates: 29.80773°N 95.36946°W

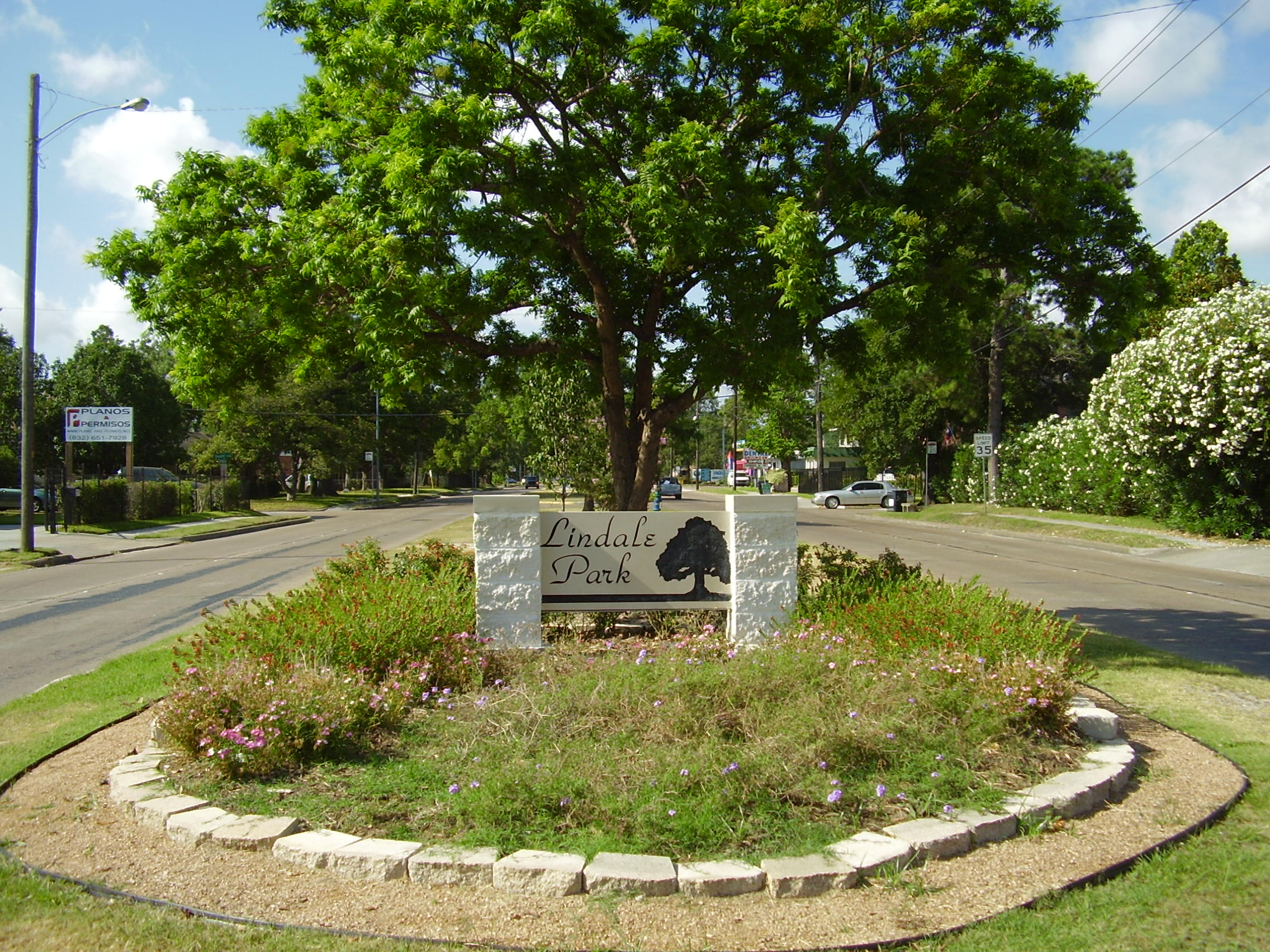
Sign for Lindale Park

Lindale Park is a neighborhood in Houston, Texas.

Lindale Park is east of Interstate 45, inside Interstate 610, and north of Downtown Houston. Lindale Park has many bungalows.

In 2004 Anjali Athavalley of the Houston Chronicle stated that Lindale Park's popularity was increasing. During that year the prices of houses ranged from $83,000 to $175,000.

== History ==
In 1937, W. Roy Reid developed the Lindale Park subdivision next to the existing Lindale Park Golf Course. Following World War II, the course was replaced with additional housing .

Lindale Park is a mixed community of thriving Ethnic-American backgrounds and cultural diversity.

== Boundaries ==
Generally it is within Fulton Street, Kelley Street, Moody Street, and Robertson Street.

== Government ==
The Harris Health System (formerly Harris County Hospital District) designated the Casa de Amigos Health Center in the Near Northside for the ZIP code 77009. The designated public hospital is Ben Taub General Hospital in the Texas Medical Center.

== Education ==
Lindale Park is zoned to the following Houston ISD schools:

- The majority of the neighborhood is zoned to Jefferson Elementary School, while a portion is zoned to Looscan Elementary School
- Marshall Middle School
- Northside High School (formerly Jefferson Davis High School)
