= Tommy Thomas (sheriff) =

American politician

Sheriff Tommy Thomas

27th Sheriff, Harris County, Texas
- In office June 28, 1995 – January 1, 2009
- Preceded by: Johnny Klevenhagen
- Succeeded by: Adrian Garcia

Personal details
- Party: Republican
- Children: Brock Thomas, 338th District Court Judge, Harris County

Military service
- Allegiance: United States
- Branch/service: United States Army
- Years of service: 1968 honorable discharge

Tommy Thomas is the former Republican sheriff of Harris County, Texas.

== Biography ==
Thomas was sworn in as the 27th sheriff of Harris County on June 28, 1995, after the resignation of Johnny Klevenhagen. He was elected to his 3rd four-year term in November 2004. Sheriff Thomas started his public service career as a member of the United States Army. After being honorably discharged in 1968, he joined the Harris County Sheriff's Office.

By 1982, he was promoted to the rank of major. In 1988, he was promoted to chief deputy under a Democratic sheriff Johnny Klevenhagen, where he remained until his appointment as sheriff.

He was the first sheriff in modern history to hold every rank within the department, including detective. His term ended in January 2009 when Adrian Garcia (D-Houston) was sworn in as the 28th Harris County Sheriff.

== Career ==
Controversy erupted in January 2008, when the sheriff's office announced that all e-mails would be deleted automatically after 14 days. Texas state law requires record retention for two to five years.

Following media investigation of the department's e-mails, Houston Ministers Against Crime said Sheriff Tommy Thomas should step down after a cartoon about the Rev. Al Sharpton and the Rev. Jesse Jackson was found in his e-mails. The group said they are worried about the mindset of Harris County leaders after learning Thomas sent that e-mail and finding out about racist e-mails sent by District Attorney Chuck Rosenthal.

On February 15, 2008, a lawsuit was filed calling for the removal from office of Thomas, as well as District Attorney Chuck Rosenthal, who resigned almost immediately.

The sheriff's office is under investigation for the surveillance of two brothers who successfully sued Harris County for civil rights violations.

In the 2008 general election, Thomas was defeated by Houston City Councilman Adrian Garcia, a Democrat.
