= ConocoPhillips Rodeo Run =

Annual race and fun run in Houston, Texas

The ConocoPhillips Rodeo Run is a point-to-point 10K race and 5K fun run/walk that has been a Houston, Texas tradition since 1988. Runners and walkers lead the Houston Livestock Show and Rodeo (HLSR) Parade past thousands of spectators in downtown Houston. Race entry fees benefit the Houston Livestock Show and Rodeo Educational Fund. The ConocoPhillips Rodeo Run is held annually on the last Saturday in February in Houston, Texas.

== Course details ==
The 10K race and 5K fun run/walk courses are point-to-point and both finish at Daikin Park with a Texas-size post-race party complete with Texas hoopla, food, live music and family fun. The ConocoPhillips Rodeo Run 10K is sanctioned by USA Track & Field and the Gulf Association of USA Track & Field. 10K race participants are expected to adhere to USA Track & Field operating regulations. The 5K fun run/walk is unsanctioned and non-competitive. While the 5K route remains flat along the downtown streets, the 10K course features a one mile elevation of the route as it travels over the Elysian Viaduct north of downtown. The course features a view of the downtown skyline coming back over the viaduct shortly before the finish at Daikin Park.

== ConocoPhillips Rodeo Run Race Results ==
=== Men's 10K Overall ===
Year	Name	Time
2011	Stephen Tanui	32:13
2010	Sean Wade	31:27
2009	Ryan Sheehan	30:10
2008	Sean Wade	31:21
2007	Sean Wade	32:48
2006	Sean Wade	31:01
2005	Sean Wade	31:30
2004	Henok Lechebo	31:26
2003	Kim Gillard	29:35
2002	Sean Wade	31:15
2001	Justin Chaston	31:04
2000	Justin Chaston	30:45
1999	Simon Peter	31:15
1998	Tim Gargiulo	29:53
1997	Justin Chaston	29:52
1996	Justin Chaston	30:59
1995	Sean Wade	29:20
1994	Justin Chaston	31:01
1993	Sean Wade	30:44
1992	Justin Chaston	31:00
1991	Justin Chaston	30:11
1990	Walter Bell	29:51
1989	Joe Flores	31:29
1988	Christian Husman	30:24

=== Women's 10K Overall ===
Year	Name	Time
2011	Angela Spadafino	36:19
2010	Mary Davies	35:32
2009	Elva Dryer	35:09
2008	Liza Galvan	35:29
2007	Andreina Byrd	36:28
2006	Cassandra Heinkiel	35:13
2005	Kelly Keane	34:02
2004	Kelly Keane	34:18
2003	Jacklyn Rzepeck	36:33
2002	Jody Hawkins	37:37
2001	Desiree Owens	36:19
2000	Nichole Wilkerson	37:03
1999	Patty Valadka	35:58
1998	Joy Smith	36:04
1997	Stacy Ware	34:28
1996	Nichole Wilkerson	36:30
1995	Nichole Alekowitch	35:16
1994	Irina Bondarchouk	36:16
1993	Joy Smith	34:56
1992	Joy Smith	35:50
1991	Wilma VanOnna	33:02
1990	Carol McLatchie	34:55
1989	Charlotte Thomas	33:43
1988	Nicky McCracken	34:13

=== Men's 10K Masters ===
Year	Name	Time
2011	Sean Wade	32:57
2010	Rudy Rocha	34:19
2009	Wilmer J. Bustillos	34:06
2008	Wilmer J. Bustillos	34:22
2007	Jon Butler	34:32
2006	Jon Butler	33:45
2005	William Martin	35:34
2004	Jon Butler	33:35
2003	Jon Butler	32:46
2002	Bill Rodgers	33:36
2001	Joe Flores	32:29
2000	Tom Boone	31:57
1999	William Martin	33:34
1998	Albin Swenson	33:46
1997	Dimitri Dmitriev	31:05
1996	Leonid Moceev	33:22
1995	Leonid Moceev	32:08
1994	Leonid Moceev	32:36

=== Women's 10K Masters ===
Year	Name	Time
2011	Jody Berry	43:28
2010	Carmen Ayala-Troncoso	37:06
2009	Peggy Yetman	36:04
2008	Ann Smith	41:54
2007	Heidy Lozano	39:26
2006	Carmen Ayala-Troncoso	36:10
2005	Carmen Ayala-Troncoso	32:26
2004	Margo Braud	39:41
2003	Joy Smith	39:56
2002	Joy Smith	37:52
2001	Margo Braud	38:54
2000	Margo Braud	38:48
1999	Barbara Rowe	43:06
1998	Patty Valadka	36:05
1997	Donna Sterns	38:22
1996	Donna Sterns	39:32
1995	Irina Bondarchouk	35:52
1994	Kathy Barton	38:21

=== Men's 10K Wheelchair ===
Year	Name	Time
2011	Brent Lakatos	25:18
2010	Juan Rios	27:06
2009	Ramiro Bermudez	28:06
2008	Brent Lakatos	23:53
2007	Brent Lakatos	25:09
2006	Orlando Cortes	25:58
2005	Ramiro Bermudez	28:18
2004	Brent Lakatos	25:14
2003	Ramiro Bermudez	26:34
2002	Ramiro Bermudez	28:11
2001	Ramiro Bermudez	25:08
2000	Ramiro Bermudez	23:17
1999	Ramiro Bermudez	24:07
1998	Jermery Fisher	24:15
1997	Ramiro Bermudez	26:45
1996	Ramiro Bermudez	26:45
1995	Juan Rios	24:58
1994	Juan Rios	27:33
1993	Bill Duff	26:13
1992	John Anderson	25:46
1991	John Anderson	24:36
1990	John Anderson	19:21
1989	John Anderson	26:59
1988	John Rendon	31:02

=== Women's 10K Wheelchair ===
Year	Name	Time
2011	Kristi Braun	1:12:31
2010	No Entrants	
2009	No Entrants	
2008	Tracey Ferguson	27:13
2007	Milena Patino	1:16:13
2006	Michelle Colvard	1:10:26
2005	Michelle Colvard	1:09:18
2004	Michelle Colvard	1:12:06
2003	No Entrants	
2002	No Entrants	
2001	No Entrants	
2000	No Entrants	
1999	No Entrants	
1998	No Entrants	
1997	Erin Johnson	45:05
1996	No Entrants	
1995	Kristen Gibson	46:44

- bold notes course record
