= Montgomery County Sheriff's Office (Texas) =

Law enforcement agency

- Abbreviation: MCSO

Agency overview
- Formed: 1837

Jurisdictional structure
- Operations jurisdiction: USA
- Map of Montgomery County Sheriff's Office's jurisdiction

Operational structure
- Headquarters: 1 Criminal Justice Dr Conroe TX 77301
- Sworn members: 500
- Sheriff responsible: Wesley Doolittle

Website
- http://www.mctxsheriff.org/

The Montgomery County Sheriff's Office is a law enforcement agency serving the citizens of Montgomery County, Texas. The 2010 census put Montgomery County's population at 455,746. A new estimate from 2019 places the population at 607,391. There are over 500 sworn deputies, with an additional 350 civilian support employees.

== History ==
Montgomery County itself was first founded on 14 December 1837, and the Sheriff's office was founded the same day. Its first sheriff was Joshua Robbins, who served from 1837 to 1841. During the 19th and early 20th centuries, the primary goal of the department was to maintain law and order in a mostly rural county. In the mid-20th century, Montgomery County experienced significant growth in its population and economy. Therefore, the MCSO grew in size to continue maintaining order in a larger county. Additionally, it expanded its services to include specialized units such as narcotics investigators and detectives. In 1993, the MCSO moved its office to its current facility located in Conroe, which now houses its training and administrative facilities as well as a jail.

== Sheriffs ==
The following is a list of every Montgomery County sheriff:

Name	Dates
Joshua Robbins	1837–1841
Archibald M. McNeill	1841–1843
Isaac McGary	1844–1845
Joseph G. Sheppard	1845–1846
Samuel Grimmett	1846–1847
Thomas Betts	1847–1848
Erasmus Giles Collier	1848–1849
Abram Helms	1849–1850
Lewis Neal	1850–1851
Thomas Wesley Smith	1851–1852
John Ford McGuffin	1852–1856
Alfred William Morris Sr.	1856–1860
Lemuel Gilliam Clepper	1860–1862
William C. Hooker	1862–1864
Ralph R. Bradly	1864–1866
Lamuel Cartwright	1866–1869
William Hames	1869
Theodore Boyd	1869
Abner Womack Sr.	1869
Alfred William Morris II	1869
Abner Womack Sr.	1869–1871
Lemuel Elisha Dunn	1871–1878
Richard Gaston Ashe	1878–1880
Daniel H. Womack	1880–1882
Ruben Davis Simonton	1882–1888
Isaac C. "Ike" Griffith	1888–1902
Maben Alexander Anderson	1902–1920
Hugh Benjamin Hicks	1920–1933
Guy Hedick Hooper	1933–1937
Grover Cleveland Mostyn	1937–1943
Herschel Raymond Surratt	1943–1947
Edwin Talley "Hoss" Anderson	1947–1949
Herschel Raymond Surratt	1949
Fannie Pearl Surratt	1949–1951
Edwin Talley "Hoss" Anderson	1951–1953
Will Shepard Willette	1953–1961
Arthur Eugene "Gene" Reaves	1961–1981
Joe Alvin Corley	1981–1993
Guy Lynn Williams	1993–2005
Tommy Gage	2005–2017
Rand Henderson	2017-2024
Wesley Doolittle	2024-

== Divisions ==
MCSO is currently composed of nine divisions. These divisions are the Administrative Services division, the Jail division, the Patrol East division, the Patrol West division, The Woodlands Township division, the Criminal Investigations division, the Executive division, the Homeland Security division, and the Law Enforcement Services division.

== See also ==
- Harris County Sheriff's Office
