= Moody Park =

Public city park in Houston, Texas, U.S.

Coordinates: 29°47′33″N 95°21′48″W

Moody Park is a public city park in the Near Northside neighborhood of Houston, Texas. It was opened in 1925 and is managed by the Houston Parks Department. It was the site of the Moody Park riots in 1978.

== History ==
The City of Houston purchased about 120 lots in 1923 for $18,000 and an additional 6 lots later that year from the Cetti family estate for $8,000, and began construction of the park. It was opened in 1925 and named for Alvin S. Moody, a local Democratic politician. The city added amenities to the park incrementally as funding allowed. By 1939, the park contained a small gymnasium and meeting rooms. A public swimming pool was installed in 1953 and the baseball diamonds were added from the 1940s through 1977. Sculptor Luis A. Jimenez’s fiberglass installation “The Vaquero” was erected in 1978.

On May 7, 1978, the Moody Park riots took place at the park. They began as a series of protests against the police murder of Jose Campos Torres, a Mexican-American who was arrested by police under dubious cause and killed while in custody. The protests turned to riot and led to more than forty arrests, a dozen hospitalizations, and hundreds of thousands of dollars of property damage to businesses and police vehicles. The aftermath resulted in a continuation of already strained police relations and a mistrust of police by the Hispanic community of Houston. It also led to significant police reforms.

In 1986, the community center was rebuilt. The new one was designed by architect W. Jackson Wisdom, and was constructed for $1,055,100. In 2014, a 7,000-square foot addition was added with additional renovations throughout the park.

In 2013, construction of the expanded METRORail red line began, with operations beginning on December 21, 2013. Moody Park Station is located at the park.
