= Atascocita Park =

Park in Harris County, Texas, United States

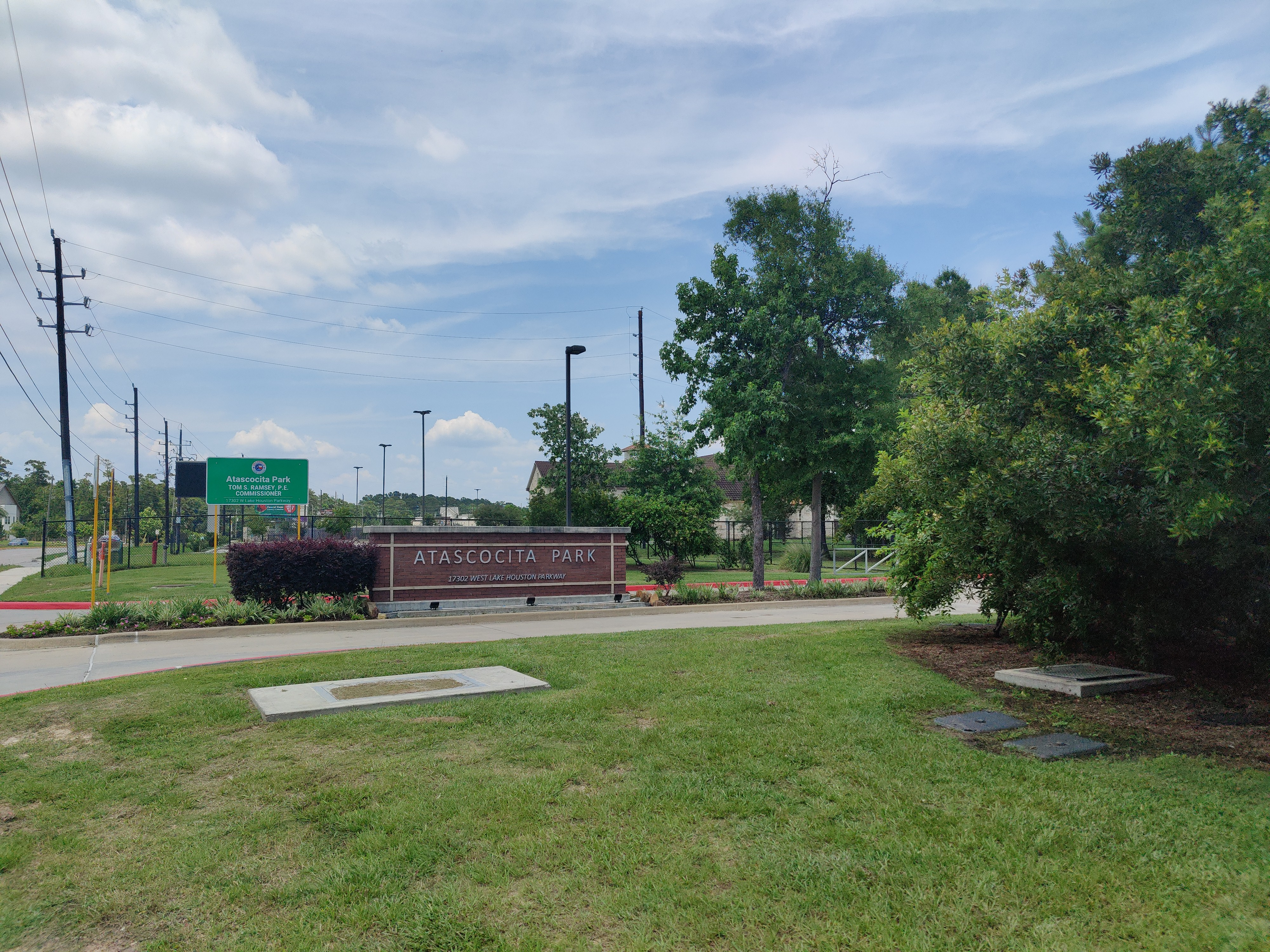
- Street sign located at the park entrance
- Interactive map of Atascocita Park
- Location: Atascocita, Texas
- Nearest city: Humble, Texas
- Coordinates: 29°58′27″N 95°10′9″W
- Opened: 24 June 2020
- Designer: Halff
- Operator: Harris County Precinct 3
- Awards: 2020 H-GAC Parks and Natural Areas Awards
- Parking: Park has free parking in on-site lot
- Facilities: Bathrooms, Picnic tables and benches under a shaded pavilion with power, and wifi.

Atascocita Park is a 21-acre park in Atascocita, Texas, with a playground, 2-acre (0.81 ha) natural pond, 1-acre (0.40 ha) dog park, and boardwalk. The park first opened on June 24, 2020. Atascocita Park includes an 8-acre (3.2 ha) hike-and-bike trail.

== Playground ==
The playground's main feature is a play skywalk (enclosed bridge) which connects to an elevated play house. The skywalk is one of the highest in the area.

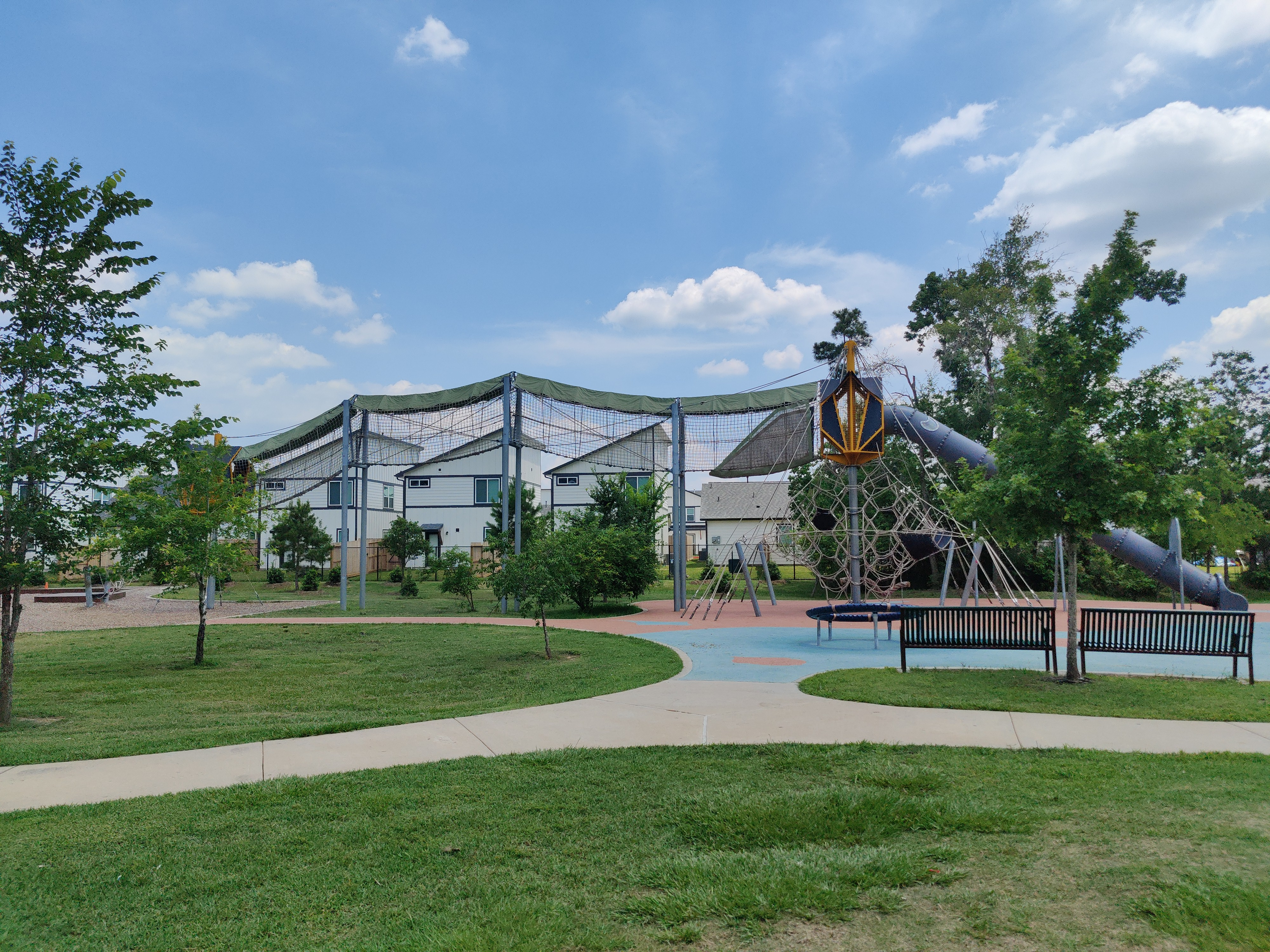
Main play structure at Atascocita Park playground

== Community Center ==
A $2.5M Community Center exists inside the park as of February 17, 2025.
