= Irma Galvan =

American restaurateur

- Born: 1941 or 1942 (age 84–85)
- Occupation: Restaurateur
- Known for: Irma's Original
- Children: 4
- Awards: James Beard Foundation America's Classics Award

Irma Galvan is an American restaurateur. She owns Irma's Original in Houston, Texas, which was named an America's Classic by the James Beard Foundation in 2008. Food & Wine called Galvan a "local legend" in Houston.

== Early life ==
Galvan was born in Brownsville, Texas and moved to Houston's Second Ward with her mother and siblings when she was five. She has a sister and two brothers. She attended Our Lady of Guadalupe School, Marshall Junior High, and Jefferson Davis High School.

Galvan's mother immigrated from Matehuala, Mexico, near Guadalajara.

== Career ==
In 1989, after Galvan lost her job when the furniture wholesaler she worked for went out of business, she opened a taco stand in to help make ends meet. The taco stand was located across the street from her former employer near Minute Maid Park in Houston's warehouse district.

In 2008 Irma's Original was named a James Beard Foundation America's Classic. During the COVID-19 pandemic, when restaurants worldwide were closed, she and her restaurant were selected for an episode of Restaurant Recovery.

In 2022 Galvan was a guest judge on Top Chef Houston. Food & Wine called her a Houston "local legend".

== Personal life ==
Galvan married Louis Galvan, a cancer researcher at Baylor University, with whom she has four children. She was widowed in 1981, when their children were aged 5 to 14, when he was murdered during a mugging.
