= Charles R. Eskridge III =

American judge (born 1963)

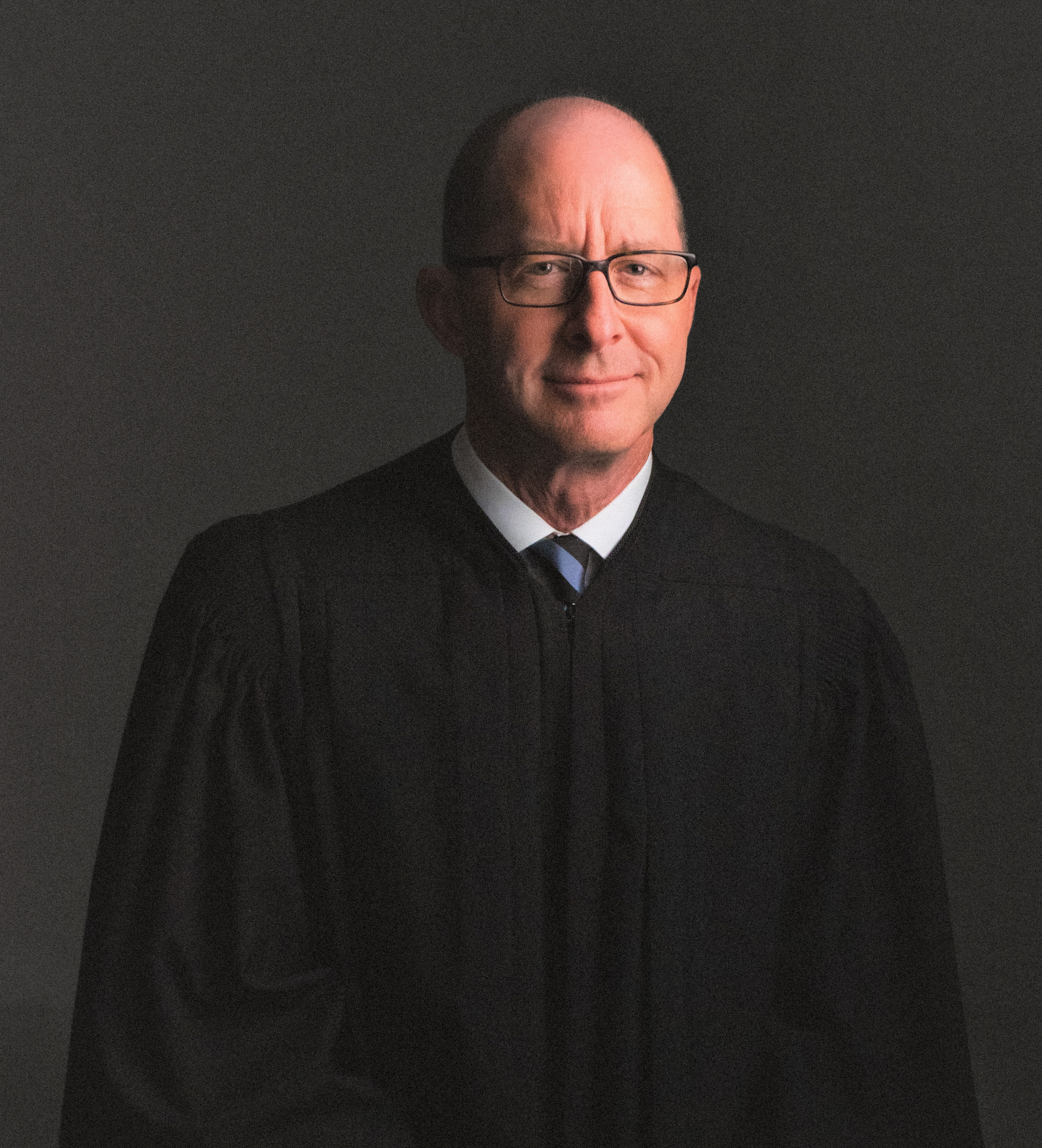
- Eskridge in 2023

Judge of the United States District Court for the Southern District of Texas
- Incumbent
- Assumed office October 17, 2019
- Appointed by: Donald Trump
- Preceded by: Gray H. Miller

Personal details
- Born: April 23, 1963 (age 63) Cleveland, Ohio, U.S.
- Education: Trinity University (BS); Pepperdine University (JD)

Charles Robert Eskridge III (born April 23, 1963) is a United States district judge of the United States District Court for the Southern District of Texas.

== Education ==
Eskridge earned his Bachelor of Science, magna cum laude, from Trinity University and his Juris Doctor, summa cum laude, from Pepperdine University School of Law. While in law school, he served as an editor of the Pepperdine Law Review.

== Career ==
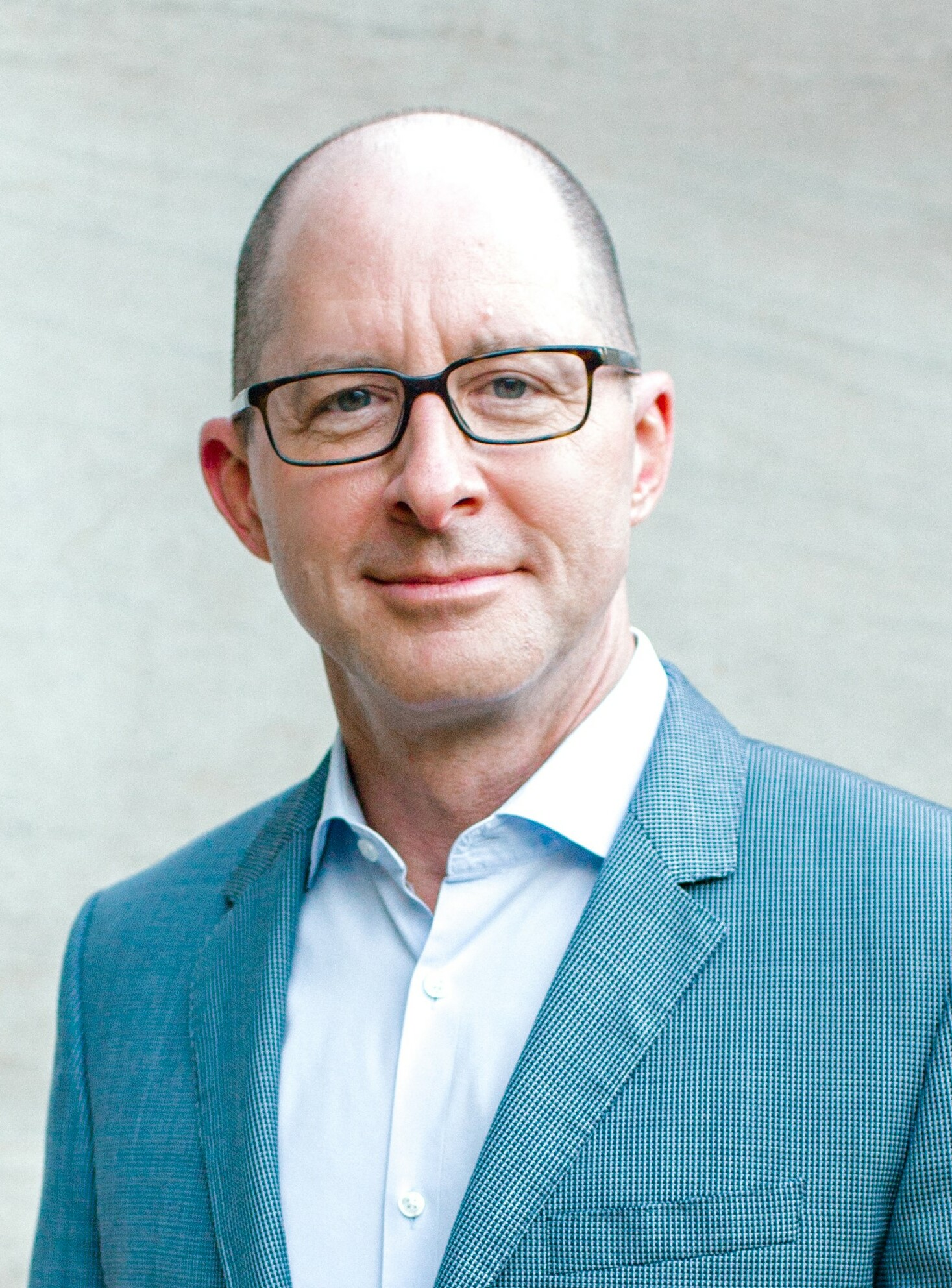
Eskridge in 2018

Upon graduation from law school, Eskridge served as a law clerk to Judge Charles Clark of the United States Court of Appeals for the Fifth Circuit and to Justice Byron White of the Supreme Court of the United States. From 1994 to 2019, he was in private practice. He previously spent over two decades in the Houston, Texas, office of Susman Godfrey and then was partner at Quinn Emanuel Urquhart & Sullivan. Eskridge serves as an adjunct professor at the University of Houston Law Center, teaching a course on the origins of the federal constitution.

Eskridge has been a member of the Federalist Society since August 2013.

=== Federal judicial service ===
On May 3, 2019, President Donald Trump announced his intent to nominate Eskridge to serve as a United States district judge for the United States District Court for the Southern District of Texas. On May 13, 2019, his nomination was sent to the Senate. President Trump nominated Eskridge to the seat vacated by Judge Gray H. Miller, who assumed senior status on December 9, 2018. On June 5, 2019, a hearing on his nomination was held before the Senate Judiciary Committee. On June 27, 2019, his nomination was reported out of committee by a 15–7 vote. On October 16, 2019, the United States Senate invoked cloture on his nomination by a 61–29 vote. His nomination was confirmed later that day by a 61–31 vote. He received his judicial commission on October 17, 2019. He took his seat on October 22, 2019.

== See also ==
- List of law clerks for the sixth seat of the Supreme Court of the United States

Legal offices
Preceded by Gray H. Miller	Judge of the United States District Court for the Southern District of Texas; 2019–present	Incumbent
