= Atascocita, Texas =

Census-designated place in Harris County, Texas, United States

- Census-designated place
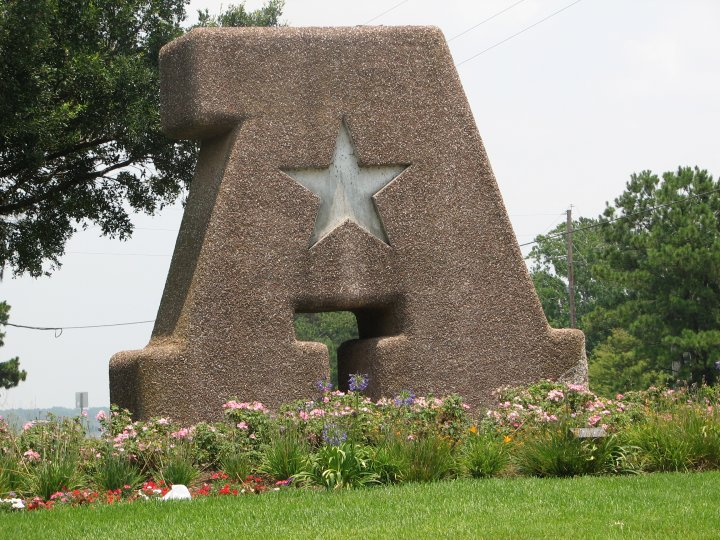
- The "Big A", with Lake Houston in the background

- Location in Harris County and the state of Texas
- Coordinates: 29°59′36″N 95°10′55″W
- Country: United States
- State: Texas
- County: Harris

Area
  - Total: 25.4 sq mi (65.8 km^{2})
  - Land: 25.3 sq mi (65.4 km^{2})
  - Water: 0.19 sq mi (0.5 km^{2})
- Elevation: 72 ft (22 m)

Population (2020)
  - Total: 88,174
  - Density: 2,599/sq mi (1,003.3/km^{2})
- Time zone: UTC-6 (Central (CST))
  - Summer (DST): UTC-5 (CDT)
- ZIP code: 77346
- Area code: 281
- FIPS code: 48-04462
- GNIS feature ID: 1877179
- Website: www.atascocita.com

Atascocita (/əˌtæskəˈsiːtə/) is a census-designated place (CDP) in Harris County, Texas, United States, within the Houston metropolitan area. As of the 2020 census it had a population of 88,174. It is located north and south of Farm to Market Road 1960 about 6 miles (10 km) east of Humble and 18 miles (29 km) northeast of downtown Houston in northeastern Harris County.

== Description ==
Bordered on its eastern shore by the 12,000-acre (4,900 ha) Lake Houston, the community contains several parks, country clubs, and golf courses, including Atascocita Country Club, Walden on Lake Houston Golf and Country Club, and Tour 18, a recreation of some of the United States' most celebrated golf holes.

== History ==
Atascocita's name derives from the Atascocito military outpost and subsequent road constructed by the Spanish in 1756. The Atascocito Road stretched from Spanish Louisiana in the east to San Antonio in the west, connecting eastern Texas to the rest of New Spain. The Atascocito Road was a major route for American migrants moving to Texas in the 1820s and 1830s. It is unclear exactly when Atascocito shifted to Atascocita.

The City of Houston annexed portions of what would become Atascocita in the 1960s, but it was de-annexed in the late 1970s.

Construction in the area began in the 1970s. In the 1990s Atascocita included fifteen neighborhoods and was one of the fastest-growing developments in the Greater Houston area.

The U.S. Census Bureau first established the Atascocita CDP for the 2000 U.S. census. The City of Houston did limited purpose annexation in Atascocita after the year 2000, therefore reducing the CDP's territory.

In 2009 the Gadberry Group named Atascocita as one of "9 from 2009" most notable high growth areas in the United States. The 2010 census listed Atascocita's population as 65,844, up from 35,757 at the 2000 census.

Atascocita has two community newspapers, The Tribune Newspaper and The Atascocita Observer.

== Geography ==
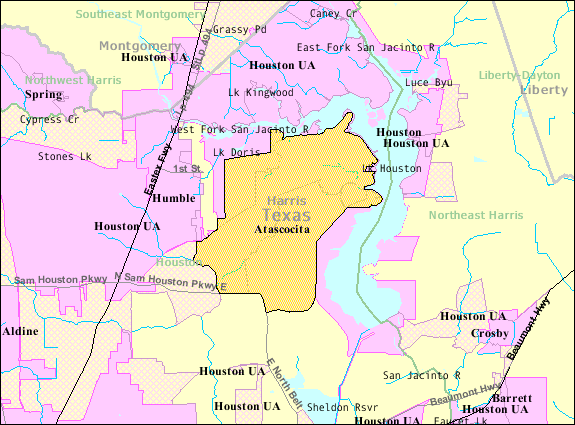
Map of the Atascocita CDP as of 2000

Atascocita is located at 29°59′36″N 95°10′55″W (29.993365, -95.182054).

According to the United States Census Bureau, the CDP has a total area of 25.4 square miles (65.8 km^{2}), of which 25.3 square miles (65.4 km^{2}) is land and 0.19 square miles (0.5 km^{2}), or 0.74%, is water.

Syd Kearney, author of A Marmac Guide to Houston and Galveston, "There are fine resort homes in sections such as Atascocita Shores."

== Demographics ==
Historical population
Census	Pop.	Note	%±
2000	35,757		—
2010	65,844		84.1%
2020	88,174		33.9%
U.S. Decennial Census; 1850–1900 1910; 1920 1930 1940; 1950 1960 1970; 1980 1990 2000; 2010 2020

Atascocita was listed as a census designated place in the 2000 U.S. census.

=== Racial and ethnic composition ===
Atascocita CDP, Texas – Racial and ethnic composition Note: the US Census treats Hispanic/Latino as an ethnic category. This table excludes Latinos from the racial categories and assigns them to a separate category. Hispanics/Latinos may be of any race.
Race / Ethnicity (NH = Non-Hispanic)	Pop 2000	Pop 2010	Pop 2020	% 2000	% 2010	% 2020
White alone (NH)	25,377	35,188	34,319	70.97%	53.44%	38.92%
Black or African American alone (NH)	4,611	12,300	20,153	12.90%	18.68%	22.86%
Native American or Alaska Native alone (NH)	81	169	218	0.23%	0.26%	0.25%
Asian alone (NH)	861	1,826	2,915	2.41%	2.77%	3.31%
Native Hawaiian or Pacific Islander alone (NH)	14	150	174	0.04%	0.23%	0.20%
Other race alone (NH)	31	113	435	0.09%	0.17%	0.49%
Mixed race or Multiracial (NH)	485	1,071	3,184	1.36%	1.63%	3.61%
Hispanic or Latino (any race)	4,297	15,027	26,776	12.02%	22.82%	30.37%
Total	35,757	65,844	88,174	100.00%	100.00%	100.00%

=== 2020 census ===
As of the 2020 census, Atascocita had a population of 88,174 in 27,900 households and 20,636 families; the median age was 34.6 years, 28.3% of residents were under 18, and 9.8% were 65 years or older. For every 100 females there were 99.1 males, and for every 100 females age 18 and over there were 97.1 males.

Of all households, 46.6% had children under the age of 18 living in them; 60.5% were married-couple households, 12.5% were households with a male householder and no spouse or partner present, and 21.9% were households with a female householder and no spouse or partner present. About 15.2% of all households were made up of individuals, and 4.8% had someone living alone who was 65 years of age or older.

There were 29,171 housing units, of which 4.4% were vacant. The homeowner vacancy rate was 1.9%, and the rental vacancy rate was 8.6%.

99.9% of residents lived in urban areas, while 0.1% lived in rural areas.

Racial composition as of the 2020 census
Race	Number	Percent
White	40,870	46.4%
Black or African American	20,572	23.3%
American Indian and Alaska Native	697	0.8%
Asian	3,012	3.4%
Native Hawaiian and Other Pacific Islander	188	0.2%
Some other race	9,345	10.6%
Two or more races	13,490	15.3%
Hispanic or Latino (of any race)	26,776	30.4%

According to the 2020 census, its racial and ethnic makeup was 38.92% non-Hispanic white, 22.86% Black or African American, 0.25% Native American, 3.31% Asian, 0.2% Pacific Islander, 0.49% some other race, 3.61% multiracial, and 30.37% Hispanic or Latino of any race.

=== 2010 census ===
As of the census of 2010, there were 65,844 people, 11,006 households, and 9,432 families residing in the CDP. The population density was 1,296.3 inhabitants per square mile (500.5/km^{2}). There were 11,342 housing units at an average density of 411.2 per square mile (158.8/km^{2}).

The racial makeup of the CDP in 2010 was 67.8% White, 19.2% African American, 0.5% Native American, 2.8% Asian, 0.3% Pacific Islander, and 2.9% from two or more races. Hispanic or Latino of any race were 22.08% of the population.

In the CDP as of 2010, the population was spread out, with 30.0% under the age of 18, 8.7% from 18 to 24, 35.7% from 25 to 44, 21.9% from 45 to 64, and 3.8% who were 65 years of age or older. The median age was 32 years. For every 100 females, there were 111.8 males. For every 100 females age 18 and over, there were 113.5 males.

=== Income and housing ===
The median income for a household in the CDP was $83,314. The per capita income for the CDP was $31,496 About 2.2% of families and 3.1% of the population were below the poverty line, including 2.7% of those under age 18 and 3.2% of those age 65 or over. In 2020, the American Community Survey estimated its median household income increased to $103,676.

Atascocita's median home price was $153,100 as of 2017; there are many subdivisions in Atascocita, ranging from small, intimate neighborhoods to large, master-planned communities like Eagle Springs, Walden on Lake Houston, The Groves, The Bridges on Lake Houston, Balmoral, Lakeshore, Waters Edge, Summerwood, Pinehurst and Atascocita Shores. New home prices range from under $200,000 to over $20 million.

== Government and infrastructure ==
=== Local and county government ===
The Atascocita Fire Department provides fire protection and emergency medical services. The Harris County Sheriff's Office provides police services.

The Atascocita CDP is divided between Harris County Precinct 1 and Harris County Precinct 4. As of 2022, Commissioners Rodney Ellis and Lesley Briones head the precincts, respectively.

The CDP is served by the Harris County Sheriff's Office District II Patrol, headquartered from the Humble Substation at 7900 Will Clayton Parkway in Humble. The Harris County Sheriff's Office Academy is in Atascocita.

The Harris County Fire Marshall's offices are in Atascocita.

The Sheriff's Office opened the Atascocita boot camp, a correctional facility for county inmates, in 1991. It closed in September 2004 as the county decided that its rehabilitation value was questionable. The vocational programs, once at the camp, were transferred to the Downtown area.

The nearest public clinic of the Harris Health System (formerly Harris County Hospital District) is the E.A. "Squatty" Lyons clinic in Humble. The nearest public hospital is Lyndon B. Johnson General Hospital in northeast Houston.

=== State representation ===
Pam Lychner Unit, a Texas Department of Criminal Justice state jail for men, is located in the Atascocita CDP. The state jail, which has beds for 2,200 residents and a residential probation program with 450 beds, was named after Pam Lychner.

== Education ==
=== Primary and secondary schools ===
Public schools

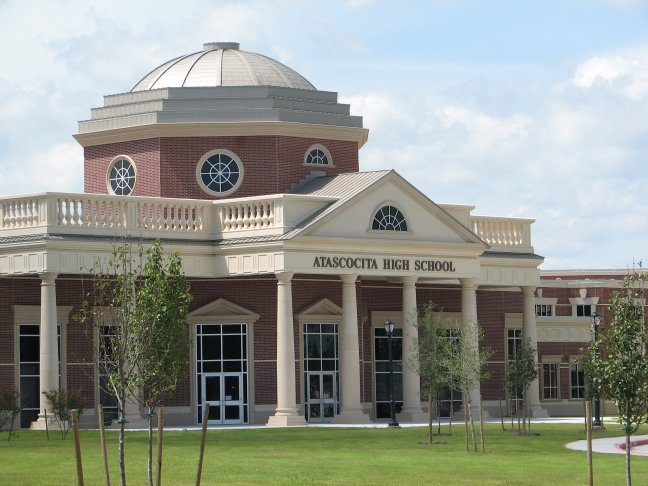
Atascocita High School

Atascocita students attend school in the Humble Independent School District.

Elementary schools within Atascocita CDP include: Atascocita Springs, Eagle Springs, Oaks, Pine Forest, Timbers, and Whispering Pines. Maplebrook Elementary School is in the limited purpose city limits of Houston and surrounded by Atascocita CDP. Other elementary schools serving portions of Atascocita include Deerwood (Kingwood), Greentree (Kingwood), Lakeshore (Houston), Park Lakes (unincorporated), River Pines (unincorporated), and Summerwood (Houston).

Most of Atascocita CDP is served by Atascocita Middle School, Autumn Ridge Middle School, Humble Middle School, Lake Houston Middle School, Timberwood Middle School, Wood Creek Middle School, and West Lake Middle School in Atascocita. Some portions are zoned to Sterling Middle School in Humble, Creekwood Middle School in Kingwood, and Riverwood Middle School in Kingwood.

Most of Atascocita CDP is served by Atascocita High School in Atascocita, while portions are served by Humble High School in Humble, Kingwood High School in Kingwood, and Summer Creek High School in an unincorporated area outside of Atascocita.

Previously Humble High School served the Atascocita area until rapid growth in the community forced the construction of Atascocita High School in 2006. With an exterior modeled after Thomas Jefferson's iconic Monticello estate, the 435,000-square-foot (40,400 m^{2}), $46.9 million school was built on a 100-acre (40 ha) heavily wooded parcel of land in the center of Atascocita. Since its opening, Atascocita High School has garnered an impressive list of academic accolades including being labeled a "Recognized" campus by the Texas State Board of Education in 2010. All students attending the Humble Independent School District have the option to apply for admission to Guy M. Sconzo Early College High School, a magnet high school in Atascocita.

Private schools

The PK-5 Holy Trinity Episcopal School is in proximity to Atascocita.

=== Colleges and Universities ===
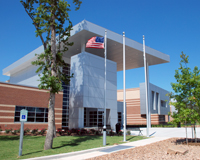
Lone Star College - Atascocita Center

Lone Star College opened its Atascocita Center in August, 2011. The center offers access to adult basic education/GED, English as a Second Language, college classes to meet degree requirements and Academy for Lifelong Learning (ALL) for seniors. The University of Houston–Downtown also offers a bachelor's degree in business administration in the evenings at the center.

=== Public libraries ===
Atascocita is served by the Atascocita Branch Library of the Harris County Public Library (HCPL), located inside the CDP. In 1986 the Atascocita Hi Neighbor group began to campaign for a library in Atascocita. The 12,000-square-foot (1,100 m^{2}) branch was built from 1994 to 1996 with the help of Janette Dennis, an Atascocita resident and philanthropist, and opened on May 5, 1996. Janette Dennis helped spearhead "The Friends of the Atascocita Library" (FOAL) donates around $20,000 United States dollars per year to the library.

== Parks and recreation ==
Atascocita Park, a 20-acre (8.1 ha) area of space on Lake Houston Parkway, opened on June 24, 2020. A part of Harris County Precinct 2, it had a cost of $11,500,000. It has a dog park with 1 acre (0.40 ha) of space, a boardwalk with a 2-acre (0.81 ha) pond, and a playground with skywalks.

Lake Houston is in the Atascocita area. Syd Kearney, author of A Marmac Guide to Houston and Galveston, said that Atascocita was "synonymous with golf, tennis, and other great recreational features on Lake Houston."

Harris County Precinct 4 operates the 136 acres (55 ha) Lindsay/Lyons Park and Sports Complex. The complex has barbecue grills, one barbecue pavilion, 10 lighted baseball fields, two lighted American football fields, picnic tables, two playgrounds (one is an all-inclusive playground and toilet facility for children of all physical abilities), four lighted softball fields, 18 unlighted soccer (football) fields, and toilet facilities. Additions added later in the park's life include a donor pavers garden, sensory garden for children with impaired sight, three 30-seat picnic pavilions, a paved walking trail around the playground, and additional trees.

== See also ==
- List of census-designated places in Texas
