= Gray H. Miller =

American judge (born 1948)

Gray Hampton Miller
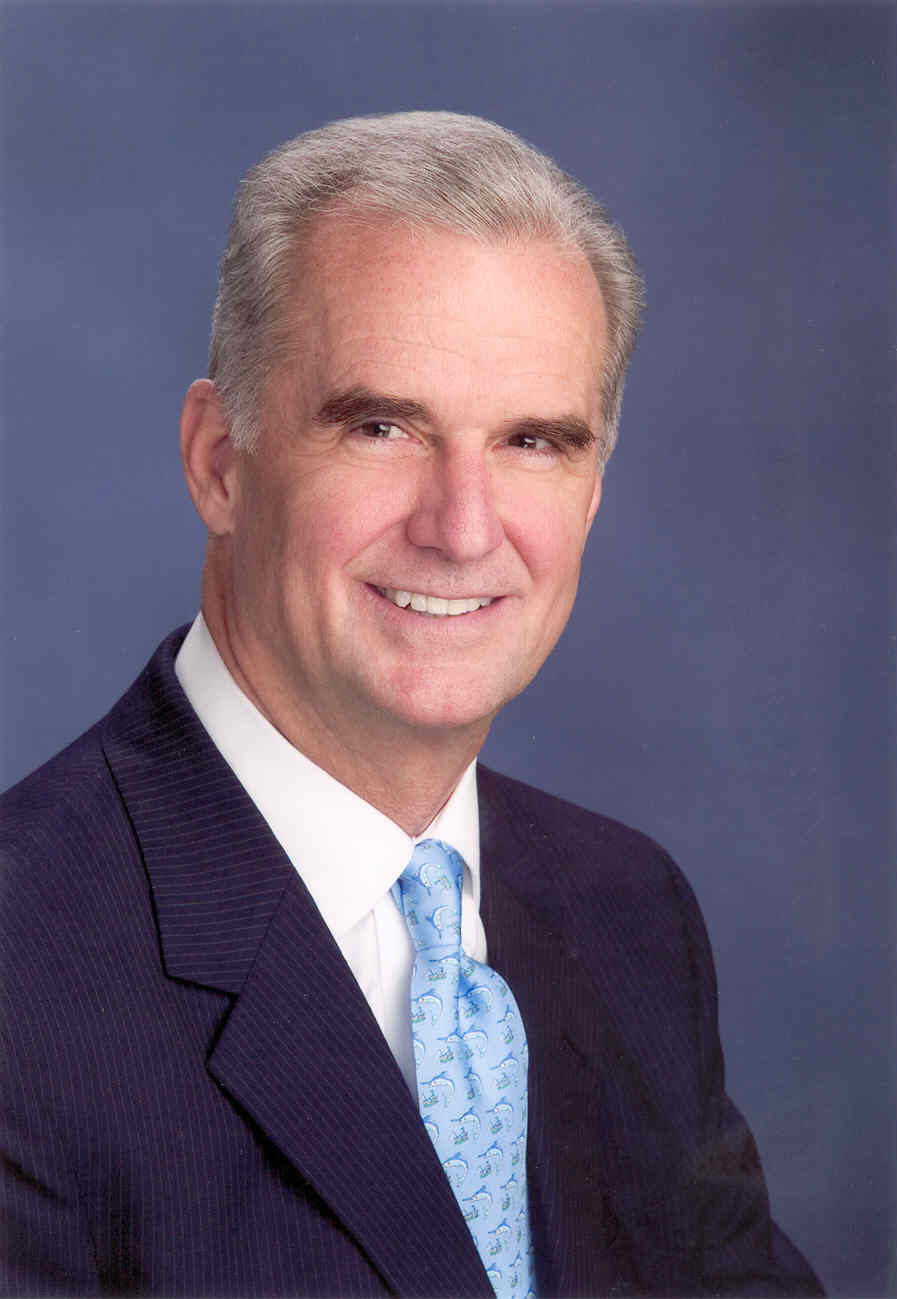

Senior Judge of the United States District Court for the Southern District of Texas
- In office December 9, 2018 – September 30, 2025

Judge of the United States District Court for the Southern District of Texas
- In office April 25, 2006 – December 9, 2018
- Appointed by: George W. Bush
- Preceded by: Ewing Werlein Jr.
- Succeeded by: Charles R. Eskridge III

Personal details
- Born: Gray Hampton Miller; 1948 (age 77–78) Houston, Texas, U.S.
- Education: University of Houston (BA, JD)

Gray Hampton Miller (born 1948) is a senior United States district judge of the United States District Court for the Southern District of Texas.

== Education and career ==
Miller attended the United States Merchant Marine Academy from 1967 to 1969, but left without receiving a degree. He received a Bachelor of Arts degree in 1974 from the University of Houston and a Juris Doctor in 1978 from the University of Houston Law Center. He served as a police officer of the Houston Police Department from 1969 to 1978. Upon graduating from law school, he joined Houston's Fulbright & Jaworski law firm, where he later became partner in 1986. Miller remained at this law firm until his appointment to the district court.

=== Federal judicial service ===
On January 25, 2006, Miller was nominated by President George W. Bush to be a United States district judge of the United States District Court for the Southern District of Texas, to the seat vacated by Judge Ewing Werlein Jr., who assumed senior status in 2006. He was confirmed unanimously by the Senate on April 25, 2006, and received his commission the same day. He assumed senior status on December 9, 2018. Miller left the court on September 30, 2025.

In February 2019, Gray Miller ruled in National Coalition for Men v. Selective Service System that the male-only military draft in the United States is unconstitutional because it violates the Equal Protection Clause of the Fourteenth Amendment to the US Constitution. That decision was reversed by the 5th Circuit Court of Appeals. A petition for review was then filed with the U.S. Supreme Court. However, the Court declined to consider it on the basis that the situation was under active review by Congress.

Legal offices
Preceded by Ewing Werlein Jr.	Judge of the United States District Court for the Southern District of Texas; 2006–2018	Succeeded by Charles R. Eskridge III
