= Adrian Garcia (politician) =

Commissioner for 2nd Precinct of Harris County

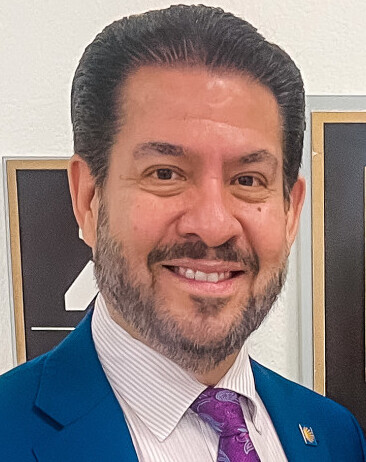
- Garcia in 2024

Member of the Harris County Commissioners Court from the 2nd Precinct
- Incumbent
- Assumed office January 1, 2019
- Preceded by: Jack Morman

28th Sheriff of Harris County, Texas
- In office January 1, 2009 – May 12, 2015
- Preceded by: Tommy Thomas
- Succeeded by: Ron Hickman

Member of the Houston City Council from the H district
- In office January 2, 2004 – January 1, 2009
- Preceded by: Gabriel Vasquez
- Succeeded by: Ed Gonzalez

Personal details
- Born: December 26, 1960 (age 65) Houston, Texas, U.S.
- Party: Democratic
- Spouse: Monica Garcia
- Education: University of Houston
- Website: Office website Campaign website

Adrian Garcia (born December 26, 1960) is an American politician serving as a member of the Harris County Commissioners Court since 2019. A member of the Democratic Party, he served as the Sheriff of Harris County from 2009 to 2015 and on the Houston City Council from 2004 to 2009.

== Early life ==
Garcia was born in Houston, Texas to Maria and Ignacio Garcia, the youngest of six children. His parents immigrated to the US after his father received a guest-worker visa before his birth, after which Ignacio Garcia petitioned to be re-admitted to the US under a work visa. In his youth, Adrian Garcia helped at his parents’ automotive repair shop.

== Law enforcement career ==
Garcia became a member of the Houston Police Department in 1980, and remained a member for 23 years. In 1994, he was appointed the first Houston Police Department's liaison to the Mayor's Anti-Gang Office. In 1999, he was then promoted to Director of the Anti-Gang Office. He has also served as a consultant for the U.S. State Department on the subject of law enforcement and policing programs in Central America.

== Houston City Council ==
In 2004, after a campaign that included negative ads targeting Garcia, which were distributed by the special interest group Citizens for a Better America, Garcia was elected the Houston city councilman for District H. Upon election he was named to the Committee on Public Safety. He also later served as the Chair of the Public Safety and Homeland Security Committee and Chair of the Minority Women Business Enterprise Committee. He also served as Vice Chair of Fiscal Affairs and the Vice Chair of Drainage and Flooding Committee. Garcia served on the Houston City Council for six years, and from 2007 to 2008 he served as Mayor Pro-Tempore under Houston Mayor Bill White.

Over his career, Garcia has been involved in issues involving the protection of disability rights. He also testified before the U.S. House of Representatives on subjects including affordable housing and border enforcement. In 2008 Garcia ran for Sheriff, during which he again suffered from negative campaign ads, this time about possible marijuana use during his childhood. Garcia stated in response that he had already admitted to this on his Houston Police Department application, and the ad ended up boosting Garcia's campaign coffers.

== Sheriff of Harris County ==
In the November 2008 election, Garcia received approximately sixty percent of the vote Sheriff of Harris County, becoming the county's first Latino sheriff.

On January 1, 2009, Garcia assumed office of the Sheriff of third largest sheriff's county in the United States,. One of his main focuses was ending the housing of inmates outside of Harris County, specifically out of state. After returning all out of county and out of state inmates to Harris County, Garcia then reprogrammed the recouped revenues to pay for additional guards and expand the use of technology in the county, including apps to connect citizens to the police.

Additional programs that Garcia implemented included Mentoring Moms, that provided parenting mentorship to female inmates who were pregnant or had just given birth. He also partnered with the district attorney's office on a pilot program to keep first-offence marijuana users out of prison. Garcia used these and other programs to reduce recidivism and prison overcrowding, using house-arrest as an alternative to incarceration. He also lobbied the legislature to reinstate mental health programs in the county, specifically geared towards crime prevention. Additionally, he worked with the FAA to introduce new helicopters to the county to protect Houston's waterways.

In 2011, a 72-year-old inmate at the Harris County Jail died from complications of a heart attack after suffering physical trauma caused by correctional officers. In response to a public outcry over excessive force, Garcia fired two jailers and one deputy for failing to aid the inmate. He then won reelection in 2012. In 2013, Garcia instituted “an LGBTI policy to protect against discrimination, aid jailers in appropriately housing and classifying inmates by gender, and keep LGBTI inmates safe,” seen as one of the most effective in the US according to the Houston Press.

In 2012, Garcia called for the continuation of 287g, a program that allows local deputies to ask individuals about their immigration status regardless of their crime. Immigrant rights group United We Dream protested Garcia to demand that he bring the program to an end, with spokeswoman Maria Jiminez stating, “We feel that there’s enough evidence to show that these programs damage communities and so, we wanted to put those concerns before the sheriff, and ask him to desist from this effort to give credibility to the 287(g) program... Our concerns deal with the fact that 287(g) has been a very harmful program to communities.” The program continued under Garcia successor Ron Hickman, but would eventually end under Harris County Sheriff Ed Gonzalez. It would remain a source of contention, as Houston Police Chief Art Acevedo and Garcia would eventually trade barbs over Garcia's support of the program.

In 2014, Garcia launched a criminal investigation into the conditions at Harris County Jail, and invited the Department of Justice to aide in the investigation, after another inmate was alleged to have been locked in a filth-ridden solitary confinement cell. As late as April 24, 2015, Garcia claimed he knew "nothing" about Goodwin's condition until after the media got involved after he attacked a prison official. Garcia has stated that he knew nothing about these conditions until after the media got involved. However, one of Garcia's former chief deputies, later claimed that he had previously told Garcia of the abuse to no effect. Local Houston activist Quanell X along with the inmate's mother called for Garcia's resignation.

In response to the incident, Garcia fired six jail officers and disciplined others. Later that year, the bipartisan Congressional Victims’ Rights Caucus awarded Garcia the Suzanne McDaniel Memorial Award for Public Awareness for his work against human trafficking. In February 2015, Garcia allowed his deputy Sheriff to become the first American deputy Sheriff to be allowed to serve wearing the Sikh articles of faith (a turban and beard) as a part of his uniform. Garcia stated that he would have to step down from his position in May 2015 in order to run for the Mayor of Houston, as per Texas law that requires the Sheriff to resign if running for another office. Upon his resignation, the Houston Chronicle wrote that, “commissioners would be doing the citizens of Harris County a disservice if they choose a successor eager to burnish his or her law-and-order, get-tough-on-crime credentials by undoing the progressive reforms Garcia has implemented in the large and unwieldy department he supervises.”

== Electoral campaign for Mayor of Houston ==
Prior to the campaign Garcia stated he supported the establishment of county-wide pre-K education as a method of future crime-prevention in addition to citing his bringing the Sheriff's department out of a $60 million deficit that existed before his term. He announced his intentions to run for Mayor, following a few months of public speculation on when he would join the race, on May 6, 2015, to replace the prior Mayor who was unable to run due to term limits. In his announcement speech, he claimed to have saved the Sheriff's department $200 million over his tenure. Following his announcement, a search for his replacement began, with Garcia retaining his position as Sheriff until his replacement could be found and appointed. During a September 2015 debate, Garcia faced questioning by his mayoral opponents regarding the role he played in one of the inmate abuse cases.

== Harris County Commissioner, Precinct 2 ==
Garcia was elected to the Harris Country Commissioners Court in the November 6, 2018 general election. He took office as the Precinct 2 Commissioner on January 1, 2019.

Garcia ran for re-election against Republican Jack Morman (the former Precinct 2 commissioner) in the 2022 election. He won the election with 52.6% (106,294) of the vote to Morman's 47.4% (95,676).

== See also ==
- Harris County Sheriff's Office (Texas)
