= Ed Gonzalez =

American law enforcement officer and politician

30th Sheriff of Harris County
- Incumbent
- Assumed office January 1, 2017
- Preceded by: Ron Hickman

Member of the Houston City Council; from the H district
- In office June 14, 2009 – January 1, 2016
- Preceded by: Adrian Garcia
- Succeeded by: Karla Cisneros

Personal details
- Born: Houston, Texas, U.S.
- Party: Democratic
- Education: University of Houston–Downtown (BS); University of St. Thomas (MS)

Ed Gonzalez is an American law enforcement officer and has served as the 30th sheriff of Harris County, Texas, since January 2017. Gonzalez was the nominee for director for U.S. Immigration and Customs Enforcement until he withdrew the nomination in June 2022.

== Early life and education ==
Gonzalez is a native of Houston, Texas. He earned a Bachelor of Science degree from the University of Houston–Downtown and a Master of Science from the University of St. Thomas.

== Career ==
Gonzalez worked as an officer in the Houston Police Department for 18 years. He was elected to the Houston City Council in 2009 and served until 2016. Representing District H, Gonzalez was also vice mayor pro tempore from 2010 to 2012. Gonzalez assumed office as the 30th sheriff of Harris County, Texas, in January 2017.

=== Immigration policy ===
Gonzalez has been critical of former and current president Donald Trump's immigration policies. In 2017, Gonzalez ended a partnership with ICE—which his department had participated in since 2008—where ten specially-trained Harris County officers were assigned to determine the immigration status of suspects in the Harris County jail. The officers were re-deployed. That same year, Gonzalez opposed a proposed state law banning sanctuary cities for illegal immigrants, and requiring local officials to cooperate with federal immigration authorities. In 2018, Gonzalez criticized US immigration policy, saying "children should not be in immigration detention", and "I do not support #ICERaids that threaten to deport millions of undocumented immigrants". In 2019, Gonzalez barred his officers from participating in raids by ICE to detain and deport illegal immigrants.

=== Bail ===
In 2017, Gonzalez testified against Harris County in federal court, saying "When most of the people in my jail are there because they can't afford to bond out, and when those people are disproportionately Black and Hispanic, that's not a rational system". At the beginning of the COVID-19 pandemic, Gonzales proposed that bail be waived "for many of the eight thousand inmates in the Harris County jail".

=== Gun legislation ===
In 2021, Gonzalez opposed a constitutional carry gun bill which would allow Texans to carry guns without permits.

=== Nomination to director of ICE ===
In April 2021, Gonzalez was nominated to be director of U.S. Immigration and Customs Enforcement. After he was nominated, allegations of domestic abuse by his wife came to light in a 2021 police affidavit report. Both Gonzalez and his wife denied that any such incident had occurred. After it became clear that the nomination was doomed due to multiple Democratic senators remaining undecided on the nomination, Gonzalez withdrew himself from consideration, stating that he would continue to serve as Harris County sheriff.
