= Murder of John Hernandez =

2017 murder in Texas

- Date: May 28, 2017
- Time: c. 11:40 p.m. (CDT)
- Location: 17700 block of the Crosby Freeway, Houston, Texas, U.S.
- Cause: Homicide
- Participants: Terry Thompson; Shauna (Chauna) Thompson
- Coroner: Harris County Medical Examiner

On May 31, 2017, John Hernandez was murdered by Terry Thompson during a fight outside a restaurant in Sheldon, Texas, part of the Greater Houston area. During the altercation, Thompson's wife, Chauna Thompson, a Harris County Sheriff's deputy, arrived and called for assistance. Bystander videos showed Terry Thompson placing Hernandez in a chokehold until he lost consciousness, while Chauna Thompson helped pin Hernandez down. Hernandez died in the hospital three days later from his injuries.

Terry Thompson was convicted of murder in 2018 and sentenced to 25 years in prison; charges against Chauna Thompson were dropped in 2019.

== Incident ==
On May 28, 2017, Terry Thompson and his children pulled into the parking lot of a Denny's restaurant in the 17700 block of Crosby Freeway in east Harris County, Texas, with their children. They encountered John Hernandez, who investigators determined was urinating in public. Thompson yelled at Hernandez to stop, and a physical fight broke out around 11:40pm. It wasn't clear which party initiated the altercation. Chauna Thompson – wife of Terry Thompson and a Harris County Sheriff's deputy – arrived, off-duty, to meet her family. She noticed the altercation and called for assistance from the sheriff's office.

Terry Thompson held Hernandez in a reverse chokehold while lying on top of Hernandez, while Chauna Thompson pinned him down. A witness also described Terry Thompson punching Hernandez in the head while holding him down. On June 5, 2017, the attorney for Hernandez's family, Jack Carroll, released a video of the incident recorded on a bystander's cellphone. The 52-second video shows Terry Thompson holding Hernandez in a chokehold while Chauna Thompson pins Hernandez down. It also shows other bystanders trying to block the videographer as well as telling the videographer that recording the altercation was illegal, with one bystander commenting that Chauna Thompson was a sheriff's deputy and she could arrest him for filming. Under Texas law, videotaping others without their permission in most public spaces when not for sexual purposes is not illegal.

=== Death ===
Hernandez was rushed to Lyndon B. Johnson Hospital, where he was placed on life support and slipped into a coma. He died three days later at the age of 24 when his life support was removed. The cause of death was ruled by the Harris County medical examiner as lack of oxygen and chest compression caused by strangulation and ruled the death a homicide.

== People involved ==
The victim, John Hernandez, was the common-law husband of Maria Toral, with whom he shared a daughter.

The perpetrator, Terry Thompson, 41, is married to Chauna Thompson. Chauna Thompson was at the time a sheriff's deputy of the Harris County Sheriff's Department.

== Immediate aftermath ==
An investigation was begun by the Harris County District Attorney's Office. Harris County Sheriff Ed Gonzalez announced that the department's internal affairs unit was looking into the incident. Family and friends of Hernandez held public demonstrations asking for an arrest.

Chauna Thompson was placed on administrative leave by the sheriff's office on June 6, 2017. Upon the conclusion of the office's investigation, Chauna Thompson was fired in June 2017, and three other sheriffs faced disciplinary action.

== Trial ==
Terry Thompson's first trial ended on June 24, 2018, when the judge declared a mistrial after the jury was unable to reach a verdict, in spite of over 29 hours of deliberation.

At retrial, Terry Thompson was found guilty of murder on November 5, 2018. On November 7, he was handed a prison sentence of 25 years.

The charges against Chauna Thompson were dropped in 2019 because prosecutors said there was insufficient evidence to prove she committed a crime.
