= Irma's Original =

Mexican restaurant in Houston, Texas, U.S.

- Interactive map of Irma's Original

Restaurant information
- Established: 1989
- Owner: Irma Galvan
- Food type: Mexican, Tex-Mex
- Location: 22 N. Chenevert St., Houston, Harris, Texas, United States
- Coordinates: 29.7602°N 95.352°W

Irma's Original, or Irma's Restaurant, is a Mexican restaurant in Houston, Texas, United States. It was opened in 1989 by Irma Galvan in Houston's warehouse district. It received an America's Classics award from the James Beard Foundation Awards.

== See also ==
- History of Mexican Americans in Houston
- List of Mexican restaurants
- List of Tex-Mex restaurants
- List of restaurants in Houston
