= Chad Holley =

Chad Holley was an Elsik High School sophomore at the time of his arrest in 2010 as an alleged burglary suspect. During the arrest, he was beaten and kicked by the Houston Police Department (HPD). He was eventually found guilty and sentenced to probation until he turned 18.

A surveillance video later aired by KTRK that was leaked by an employee of a storage lot adjacent to the location of the beating after a short police chase.

On June 13, 2012, having just come off of probation the preceding April, Holley was again arrested, this time by the Harris County Sheriff's Office, along with three others as they tried to evade police. The four were seen running out of a northwest Harris County home with items and driving off. A witness reported the break-in and gave 911 a description and the license plate number to the vehicle. Officers responding to the burglary-in-progress call pulled the vehicle over, taking all four into custody. Quanell X claims was that Holley was "off his medications for mental illness and is a special education student" and does not comprehend the consequences. On December 12, 2016, Holley was charged with capital murder. The charges stem from the shooting death of David Trejo-Gonzalez, 42, during a robbery in September 2016.

== Disciplinary actions ==
After an investigation, twelve officers were disciplined, seven were fired, and four were charged. All appealed the decisions. Officer Andrew Blomberg, the first of four officers to go on trial, has been acquitted of charges of "Official Oppression"

== New oversight ==
Mayor Parker says she'll be creating a new 20-member, independent police oversight board. There will also be a separate public safety advisory committee. The Office of Inspector General will act as confidential ombudsman for citizen complaints. The mayor said she will make an executive order, but the Houston Police Officers' Union says that step shouldn't be necessary as it would create an additional bureaucracy.

== Civilians documenting police ==
Houston Police Chief Charles McClelland has said there has been an increase of people recording or taking pictures of police while making stops and is concerned that an intensifying anti-police sentiment in the community could increase negative interactions with residents.

== Capital murder charge ==
Chad Holley, the man at the center of a 2010 beating probe involving Houston police, was charged with capital murder. The charges stemmed from the shooting death of David Trejo-Gonzalez, 42, during a robbery in September 2016. Police said Trejo-Gonzalez was shot around 9:45 pm at East Crosstimbers near Fulton on Wednesday, September 21. HPD called it a robbery gone bad, and said the victim was walking from the parking lot of his apartment when he was attacked. The suspect, who was unknown to police at the time, was said to have driven off in a white low-rider style truck or SUV, driven by an accomplice. Holley was identified as Trejo-Gonzalez's alleged killer. He was the one police suspected of shooting Trejo-Gonzalez during the scuffle. Holley was charged on December 12, 2016, and was due before a judge downtown on December 13, 2016. A Harris County Grand Jury declined to indict Holley for capital murder on March 10, 2017.
