= Harris County Sheriff's Office =

Agency headquartered in Houston, Texas

- Patch of Harris County Sheriff's Office

- Badge of Harris County Sheriff's Office
- Abbreviation: HCSO

Agency overview
- Formed: 1837; 189 years ago
- Employees: 3,545
- Annual budget: $717 m (2020)

Jurisdictional structure
- Operations jurisdiction: Harris County, Texas, Texas, United States
- Legal jurisdiction: Harris County, Texas
- General nature: Local civilian police

Operational structure
- Headquarters: 1200 Baker St. Houston, TX 77002
- Deputies: 2,545
- Civilian employees: 1,000
- Sheriff responsible: Ed Gonzalez
- Agency executive: Mike Lee, Chief Deputy

Facilities
- 3 Helicopters: OH-58 Kiowa, Astar & Cirrus fixed wing

Website
- Harris County Sheriff's Office Website

The Harris County Sheriff's Office (HCSO) is a local law enforcement agency serving the over four million citizens of Harris County, Texas, United States. It is headquartered on the first and second floors in the 1200 Baker Street Jail in Downtown Houston.

As of the 2010 U.S. census, the county had a population of 4.1 million, making it the most populous county in Texas and the third most populous county in the United States. Its county seat is Houston. The Harris County Sheriff's Office has approximately 3,500 employees and is the largest sheriff's office in the state of Texas and the sixth largest in the nation. The number one and two largest sheriff's offices in the nation are respectively the Los Angeles County Sheriff's Department in California and the Cook County Sheriff's Office in Illinois. The third, fourth, and fifth are the Broward County Sheriff's Office in Florida, the Palm Beach County Sheriff's Office in Florida, and the San Diego County Sheriff's Office in California.

The Harris County Sheriff's Office is the primary law enforcement agency in the 1,118 square miles (2,900 km^{2}) of unincorporated area of Harris County, serving as the equivalent of the county police for the approximately 1,071,485 people living in the unincorporated areas of the county. In Texas, sheriffs and their deputies are fully empowered peace officers with county-wide jurisdiction and thus, may legally exercise their authority in unincorporated and incorporated areas of their county; they primarily provide law enforcement services for only the unincorporated areas of a county, while yielding to municipal police or city marshals to provide law enforcement services for the incorporated areas. Sheriffs and their deputies also have statewide warrantless arrest powers for any criminal offense (except certain traffic offenses) committed within their presence or view. They also may make arrests with a warrant anywhere in the state. In an emergency, sheriffs along with mayors and district judges are empowered by state law to call forth the National Guard to preserve the peace.

The jurisdiction of the Harris County Sheriff's Office often overlaps with several other law enforcement agencies, among them the Texas Highway Patrol, the eight Harris County Constable Precincts, and several municipal police agencies including the city of Houston Police Department. The duties of a Texas sheriff generally include keeping the county jail, providing bailiffs for the county and district courts within his county and serving process issued by said courts, and providing general law enforcement services to residents. The current sheriff of Harris County is Ed Gonzalez, elected in 2016 and has been in office since January 1, 2017.

== History ==
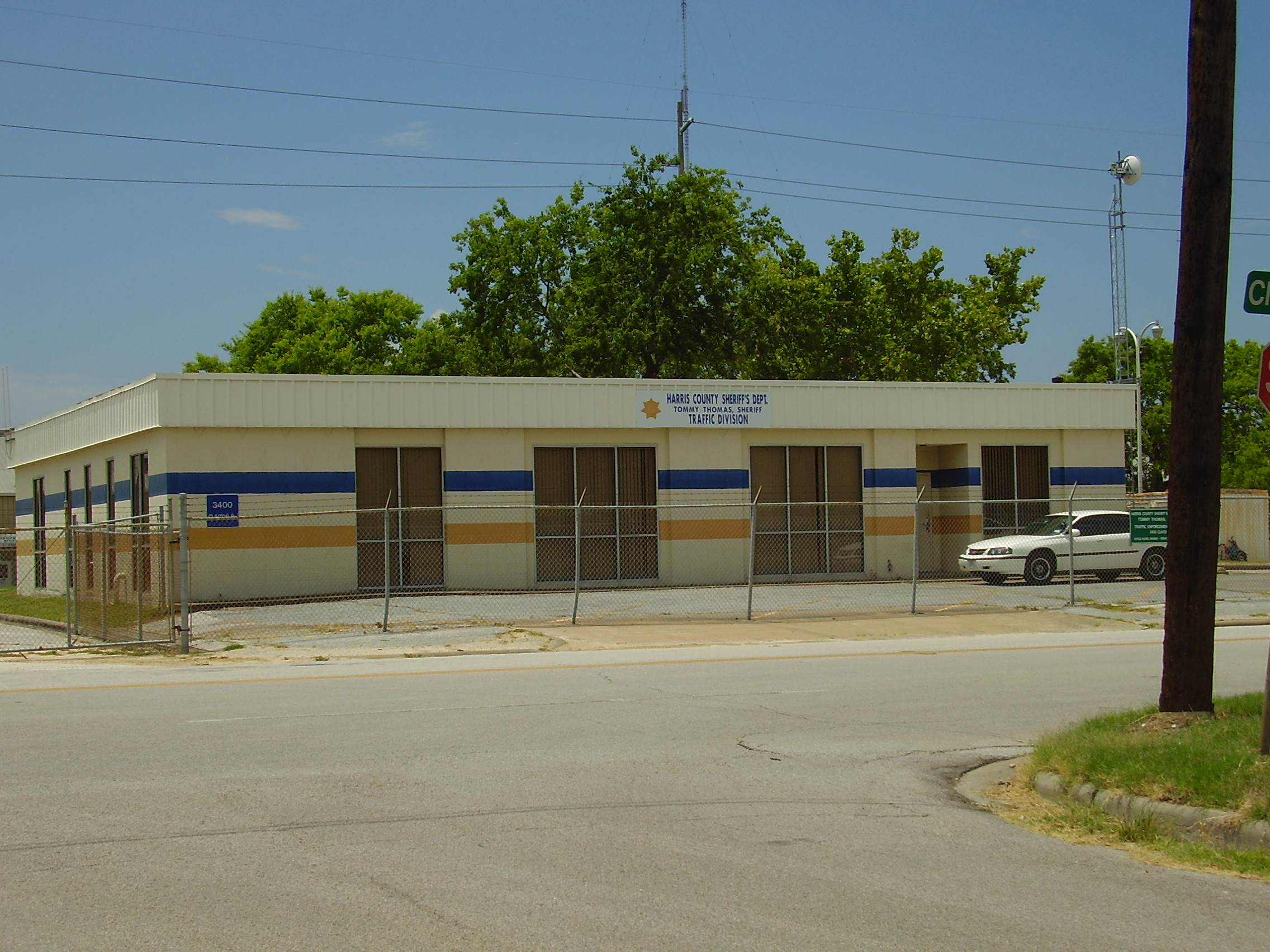
Traffic Division

John Moore was sworn in as the first sheriff of what was then called Harrisburg County (later renamed Harris County) in February 1837. Among the oldest law enforcement agencies in Texas, the department has grown from a single man on horseback to a modern agency with 3500 employees, including over 2500 sworn officers.

On May 31, 2017, John Hernandez died after being placed in a choke hold after a fight by officers Terry Thompson and Chauna Thompson, a married couple. The death was ruled a homicide by the Harris County medical examiner on June 6, 2017, and both Thompsons were charged with murder.

In 2025, four of the department's deputies committed suicide in the space of four weeks, prompting national coverage.

== Sheriffs ==
Harris County sheriffs:

Name	Dates
John W. Moore	1837-1841
John Fitzgerald	1841-1843
Mangus T. Rodgers	1844-1846
David Russell	1846-1850
James B. Hogan	1850-1854
Thomas M. Hogan	1854-1856
John R. Grymes	1856-1858
George W. Frazier	1858-1861
B.P. Lanham	1861-1865
John Proudfoot	1866
Irvin Capters Lord	1866
A.B. Hall	1866-1873
Sam S. Ashe	1873-1875
Cornelius M. Noble	1876-1883
John J. Fant	1884-1886
George W. Ellis	1887-1895
Albert Erichson	1896
W. M. Baugh	1897-1898
Archie Anderson	1899-1912
Marion F. Hammond	1913-1918
Thomas A. Binford	1919-1936
Norfleet Hill	1937-1942
Neal Polk	1942-1948
Clairville "Buster" Kern	1949-1972
Jack Heard	1973-1984
Johnny Klevenhagen	1985-1995
Tommy Thomas	1995-2009
Adrian Garcia	2009–2015
Ron Hickman	2015-2017
Ed Gonzalez	2017-

== Fallen officers ==
Since the establishment of the Harris County Sheriff's Department, 45 officers have died in the line of duty.

Officer	Date of death	Details
Carl F. Courts	November 30, 1895	Gunfire
James A. Reed	September 6, 1905	Gunfire
Arthur Taylor	May 24, 1914	Accidental gunfire
William C. Williams Jr.	April 16, 1930	Accidental gunfire
Joe Trapolino	May 23, 1936	Gunfire
Theron Eldridge (Eddie) Shofner	July 14, 1948	Gunfire
Leo Busby	September 10, 1953	Automobile accident
Donald E. Knowlton	August 22, 1960	Gunfire
Walter Howard Harvey	November 5, 1962	Automobile accident
Fred B. Peebles	September 23, 1965	Vehicular assault
Edd Williams	January 12, 1974	Gunfire
Rodney Scott Morgan	February 26, 1974	Accidental gunfire
Jimmie Howard McKay Sr.	March 22, 1974	Gunfire
James A. Wier	August 18, 1978	Vehicle pursuit
Joe Mason Westbrook	July 1, 1979	Gunfire
Albert Ochoa Garza	July 30, 1979	Gunfire
Royce Melvin Anderson	October 26, 1981	Accidental gunfire
Reginald Floyd Norwood	September 3, 1985	Vehicle pursuit
Haskell Junior McCoy	February 2, 1987	Automobile accident
Clark Harold Henry	July 25, 1988	Automobile accident
Richard Maurice Blackwell	September 6, 1989	Motorcycle accident
Jeffery Scott Sanford	September 14, 1991	Gunfire
Ricky A. Yates	January 25, 1994	Motorcycle collision
Harvey Davis	May 21, 1996	Heart attack
Douglas John Noll	July 22, 1996	Vehicle pursuit
Randolph Michael Eng	December 21, 1996	Gunfire
Keith Alan Fricke	June 4, 1997	Motorcycle accident
Rebecca Ann Shaw	February 13, 1998	Struck by train
Oscar Clarence Hill IV	July 22, 2000	Vehicular assault
John Charles Risley	October 23, 2000	Gunfire
Barrett Travis Hill	December 4, 2000	Gunfire
Joseph Norman Dennis	May 22, 2001	Gunfire
Shane Ronald Bennett	June 12, 2002	Accidental gunfire
Thomas Flores Douglas	Wednesday, March 10, 2004	Heart attack
Tommy L. Keen	September 15, 2008	Accidental
Dionicio M. Camacho	October 23, 2009	Heart attack
Eddie L. Wotipka	June 10, 2010	Drowned
Jesse "Trey" Valdez, III	October 29, 2014	Automobile; Narcotics involved
Tronoski Jones	August 20, 2015	Heart attack
Darren H. Goforth	August 28, 2015	Gunfire
Omar Diaz	July 6, 2019	Duty related illness
Sandeep S. Dhaliwal	September 27, 2019	Gunfire
Cornelius Anderson	July 12, 2020	Duty related illness
Bruce Watson	January 2, 2021	Motorcycle accident
Darren Almendarez	March 31, 2022	Gunfire

== Correction facilities ==
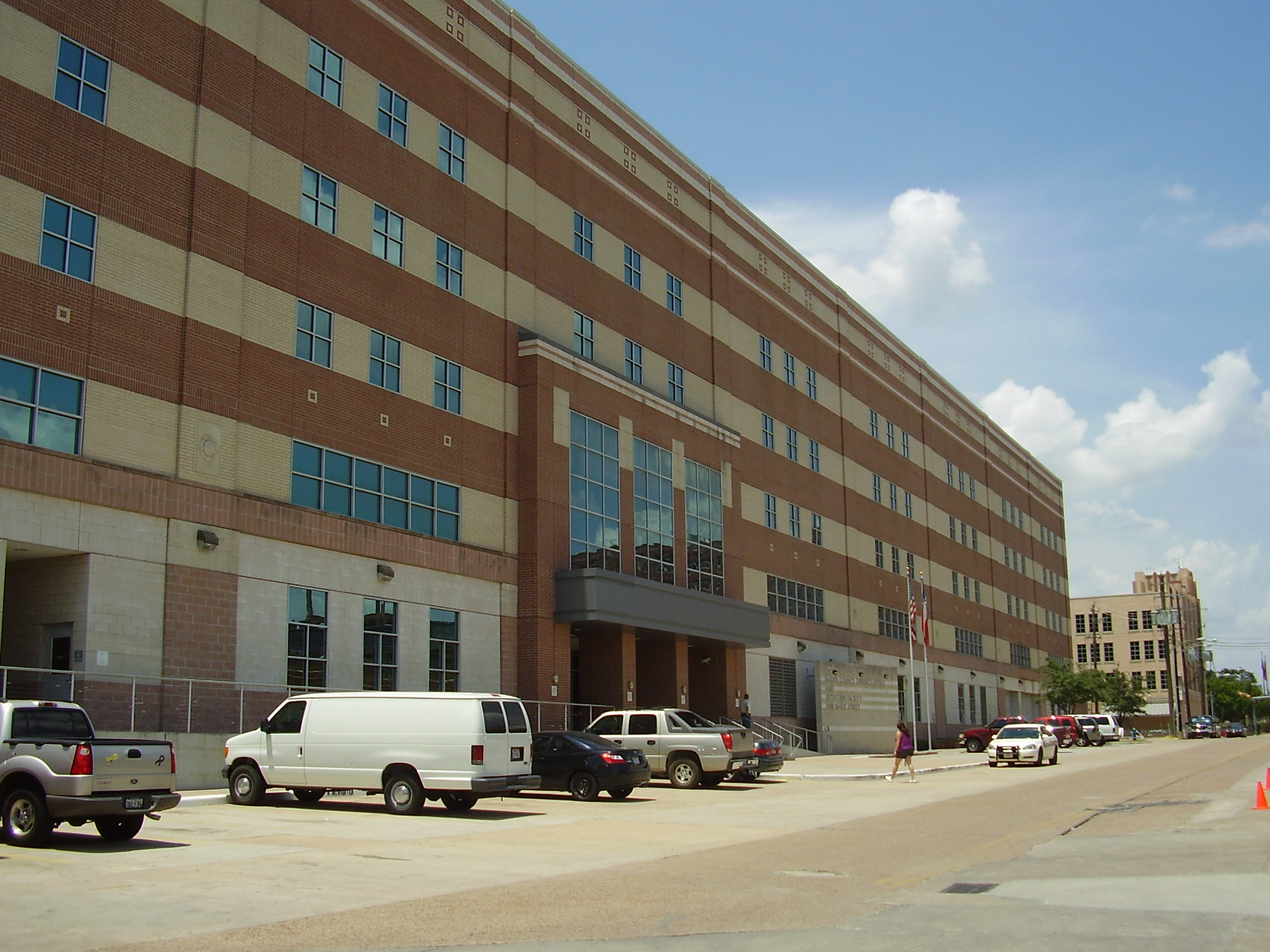
The 1200 Jail, the headquarters of the agency

The Harris County Sheriff's Office's correction facilities are located in Downtown Houston, all within a block of one another. They include the 1200 Jail (located at 1200 Baker Street), the 701 Jail, and the 1307 Jail. Previously 1301 Franklin and 301 San Jacinto were jails.

As of 2012 the Harris County jail facilities together have a capacity for 9,434 inmates; at time they have held over 12,000. Due to the excess number of prisoners, the HCSO had to ship inmates to other jails, including some in Louisiana; in June 2010 1,600 Harris County inmates were serving time at other jails. By January 2012 the Harris County jails had 8,573, a decrease by 31% from 2008 to 2012, and there were only 21 inmates serving time in other jail facilities, all in Texas.

The county opened the Atascocita boot camp in 1991, but it closed in September 2004 as the county decided that its rehabilitation value was questionable. The vocational programs, once at the camp, were transferred to the Downtown area.

On February 15, 2023, the Federal Bureau of Investigation opened a federal civil rights investigation into the jail after dozens of inmate deaths in the past few years: 21 in 2021, 28 in 2022, and 4 in the first two months of 2023.

== See also ==
- List of law enforcement agencies in Texas
- Crime in Houston
- Montgomery County, Texas Sheriff's Office
