= Near Northside, Houston =

Neighborhood of Houston, Texas

Coordinates: 29.786°N 95.358°W

Near Northside is a historic neighborhood located in Northside, Houston, Texas. Near Northside is primarily occupied by people of Hispanic descent.

In a 70-year period until 2015 the community had been majority Hispanic after initially being made up of German American and Italian American immigrants who settled in the period 1900-1940. It is in proximity to Downtown Houston.

== History ==
Development of the Near Northside neighborhood began in the 1880s-1890s with the expansion of the nearby Hardy Rail Yards. Immigrants from Europe, primarily Italians, Germans, Poles, and Czechs, moved into the area and it became a working-class neighborhood. With the decrease of railroad traffic and increase in suburban development in Houston, the neighborhood began to decline following World War II. Thereafter, Hispanic immigrants, mostly of Mexican heritage, began moving into the area. The neighborhood underwent alteration from the construction of the Elysian Viaduct - a major roadway into downtown, which required the use of eminent domain to construct.

Near North Side's Moody Park was the location of the Moody Park Riots. On May 7, 1978, the Mexican American community in the area took to protest following the police killing of Jose Campos Torres (a war veteran who was killed by police while taken into dubious custody). The protests turned to riot and led to more than forty arrests, a dozen hospitalizations, and hundreds of thousands of dollars of property damage to businesses and police vehicles. The aftermath resulted in a continuation of already strained police relations and a mistrust of police by the Hispanic community of Houston. It also led to significant police reforms.

Preservation Texas, an organization dedicated to preserving historic resources in the state of Texas, named Near Northside Neighborhood to list of Texas' most endangered historic places in 2005.

In 2011 the community was listed in the National Register of Historic Places. The Avenue Community Development Corp. supported the listing.

In 2013, construction began on the expanded METRORail red line, which runs through the neighborhood with several stations along North Main Street and Fulton Street. The rail began operations on December 21, 2013.

By 2015, with major gentrification of inner Houston neighborhoods, some residents of one subdivision, Glen Park, advocated for minimum lot size rules in order to prevent large townhouses from being built in Near Northside.

== Composition ==
The boundaries of the Near Northside community are Interstate 45, Hardy Street, Burnett Street, and roughly Cavalcade Street.

Before the development of the interstate system in the mid-20th century, there was an area at the intersection of Hill Street and Lyons Avenue named "Pearl Harbor." The writer Sigman Byrd, active from the late 1940s until the early 1960s, wrote about it, and the writings were published in Sig Byrd's Houston.

== Education ==
=== Primary and secondary schools ===
==== Public schools ====
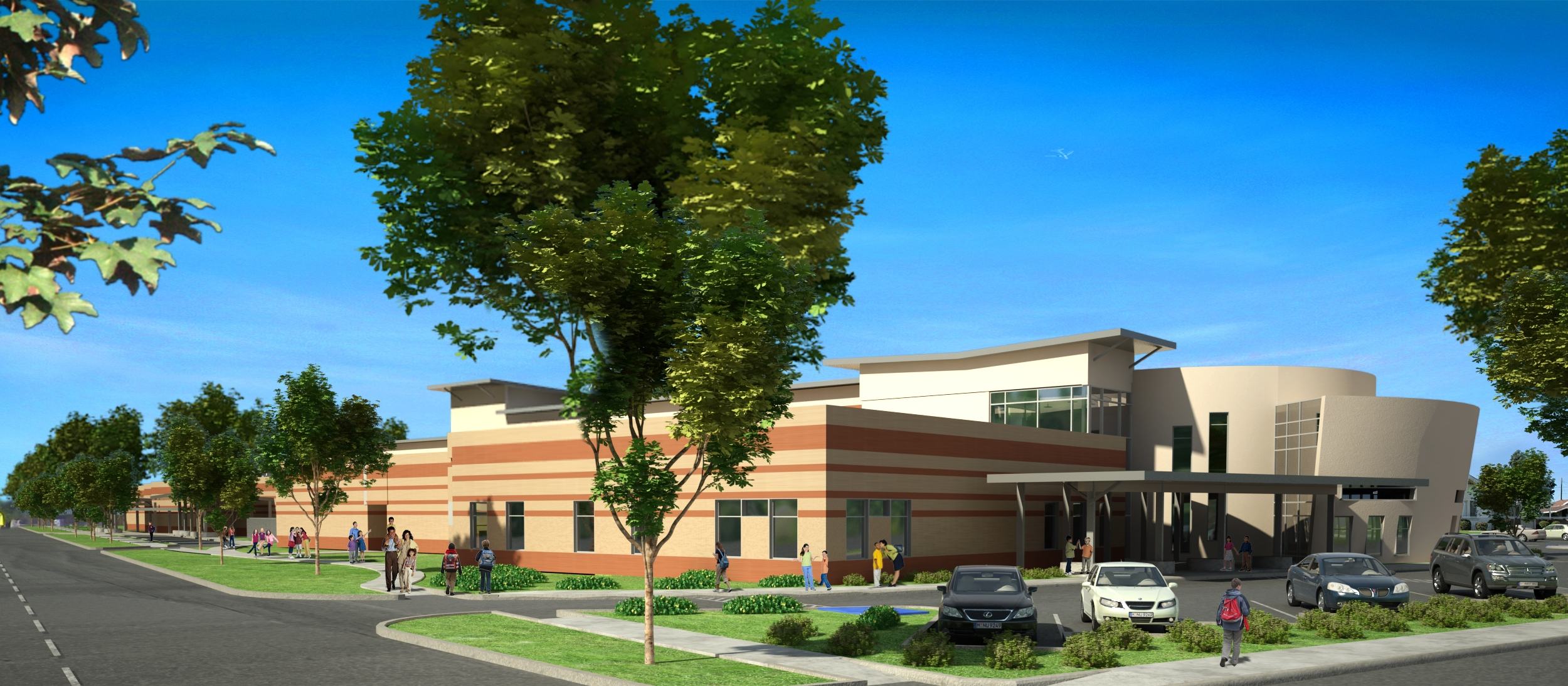
Northside Elementary School

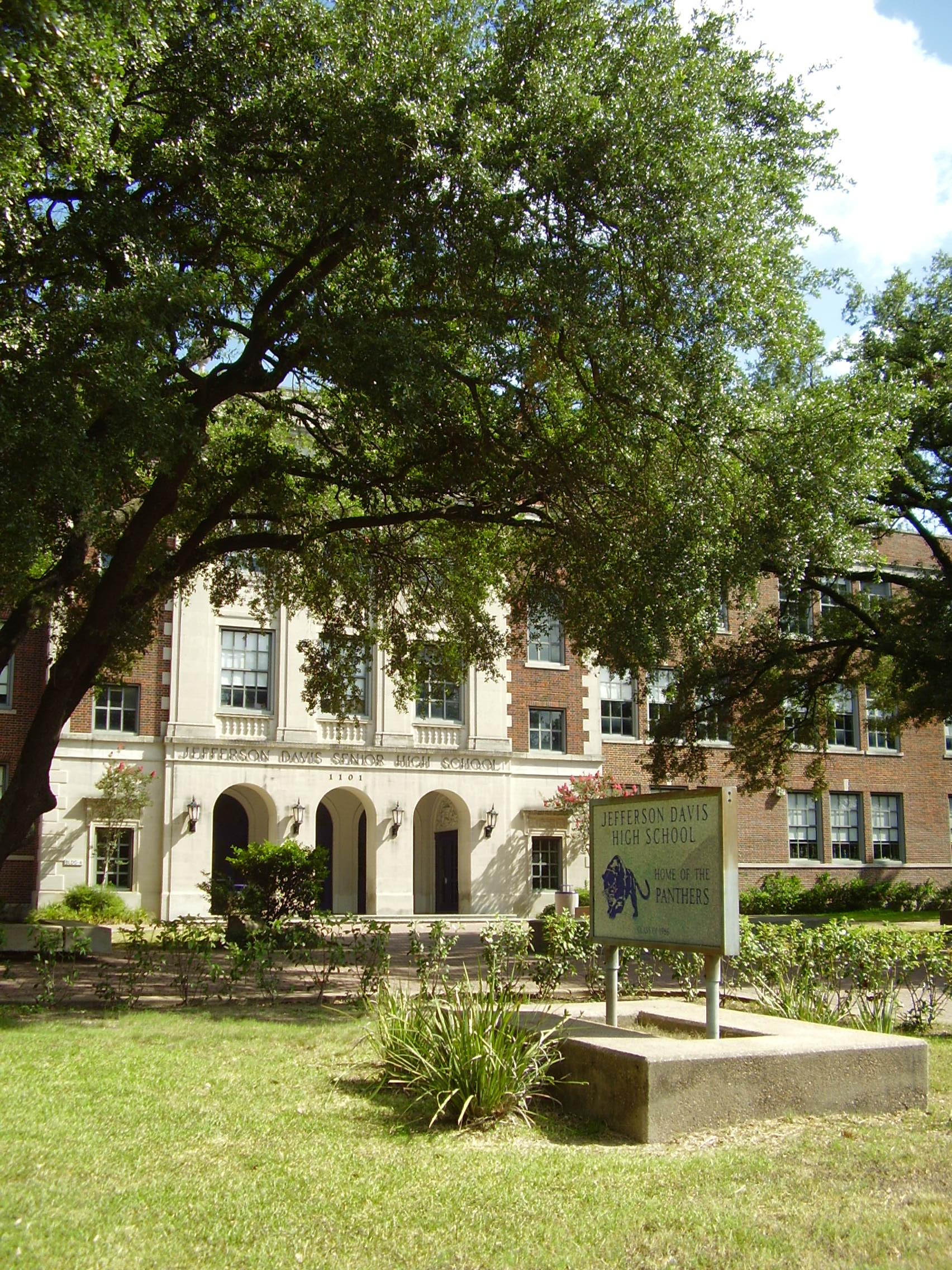
Northside High School

Near North Side is served by the Houston Independent School District.

Elementary schools serving sections of the community within the Near North Side include Ketelsen, Looscan, C. Martinez, and Sherman.

All residents are zoned to Marshall Middle School and Northside High School (formerly Jefferson Davis High School).

Elementary schools formerly serving the Near Northside include Lamar Elementary, Lee Elementary, and Ryan Elementary.

The new Northside Elementary School will be built in place of Sherman Elementary on McKee St. HISD plans to level Sherman Elementary and build a new, larger school at its current location in Northside Village. The work will consist of demolishing the existing buildings on the site (including the school building and houses) and construction of a new 86,000-square-foot (8,000 m^{2}) school building to accommodate 750 students.

Northside High is located on Quitman Street. Marshall Middle School is across from Davis. Nearby elementaries are Sherman and the brand new Ketelsen which replaced Lamar and Lee Elementaries.

YES East End, a charter Grade 6 middle school, is actually located in the Near North Side area, northwest of the East End area.

==== Private schools ====
The Roman Catholic Archdiocese of Galveston-Houston oversees the Holy Name School, a Kindergarten through 8th Grade school in the area . January 2009 the Archdiocese of Galvesto-Houston announced the closing of Holy Name School.

=== Public libraries ===
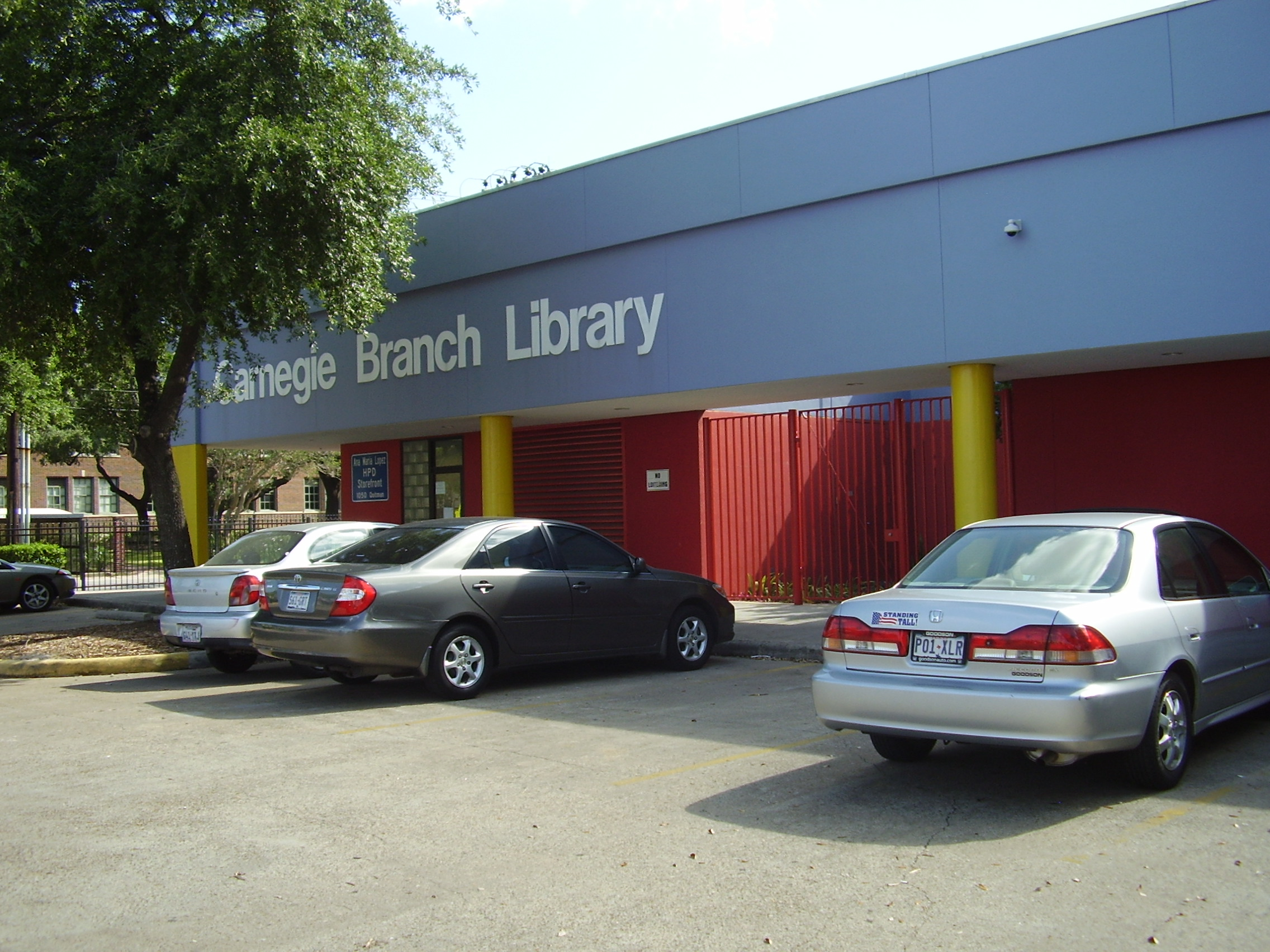
Carnegie Neighborhood Library and Ana Maria Lopez Houston Police Department Storefront

The Houston Public Library's Carnegie Neighborhood Library and Center for Learning serves the community.

== Community services ==
Harris Health System (Harris County Hospital District) operates the Casa de Amigos ("House of Friends") Health Center at 1615 North Main Street and the Thomas Street Health Center (AIDS center) at 2015 Thomas Street; both are in Houston.

Casa de Amigos Health Center opened on August 21, 1970 in the near Northside.

The hospital system designated the Casa de Amigos clinic for the ZIP code 77009 and the Aldine Health Center for the ZIP code 77022. The designated public hospitals for these two ZIP codes are Ben Taub General Hospital in the Texas Medical Center and the Lyndon B. Johnson Hospital in northeast Houston, respectively.

The City of Houston Health Department also operates the Nueva Casa de Amigos ("New House of Friends") Clinic.
