= Bill Carmody (lawyer) =

American lawyer

- Born: Manhattan, New York, U.S.
- Education: United States Merchant Marine Academy (BS); The University of Tulsa College of Law (JD)
- Occupation: Trial lawyer
- Employer: Susman Godfrey LLP
- Spouse: Catherine Gillis Carmody

William Christopher Carmody is an American lawyer and partner at Susman Godfrey LLP, a commercial litigation boutique. He is a member of the firm’s executive committee and is the senior partner of its New York office. As of 2026, his hourly rate was among the highest of all lawyers in the U.S. at $4000 an hour, though he is primarily paid based on the outcome of his cases. He first received public recognition during the 1990s when ABC’s Nightline featured him conducting a mock trial in connection with the O. J. Simpson trial. His clients have included Louis Bacon, Dan Loeb, Adam Neumann, the City of Baltimore, General Electric, Match Group, Uber, and Yale University. Carmody is known for representing both plaintiffs and defendants in high-stakes jury trials, often stepping in on the eve of trial.

== Early life and education ==
Carmody was born in Manhattan, New York, and grew up in Levittown on Long Island, New York. He was adopted along with his siblings, a sister and a late brother. He attended the United States Merchant Marine Academy in Kings Point, New York, where he earned a bachelor’s degree in engineering. After graduation, he served a year at sea. He later ran a nightclub in Miami before moving to Oklahoma for law school. To support himself during law school, he bartended at a Tulsa restaurant and convinced the owners to turn it into a successful nightclub. In 1988, he received a J.D. degree from the University of Tulsa College of Law. In 2014, he was inducted into the University of Tulsa College of Law’s Hall of Fame. In 2015, the University of Tulsa named Carmody a distinguished alumni.

== Career ==
Following law school, Carmody was hired as an associate at Fulbright & Jaworski (now Norton Rose Fulbright), then the largest firm in Texas. He worked there for three and a half years before leaving in 1992 with colleague Tim Robinson to open their own Dallas trial firm, Robinson Carmody. In 1994, Carmody went on to open his own trial firm focusing on business litigation.

Carmody’s first major victory came in 1996, when he represented Altair Strickland, a small oil service company, in a jury trial against Chevron and secured a $61 million verdict. Carmody’s downtown Dallas office included a full-size mock courtroom that was used to prepare for upcoming trials.

When Carmody mailed his law firm brochure to every lawyer in the state of Texas, he caught the attention of Steve Susman, the co-founder of Susman Godfrey LLP. This eventually led to a dinner between the two men and a decades-long friendship. In 2000, Carmody joined Susman Godfrey, and in 2007, he was tapped to lead the firm’s New York office.

=== Notable cases ===
In 2007, insurance company Legal & General hired Carmody six days before trial to defend one of its subsidiaries, William Penn, in a class action lawsuit brought by 25,000 policyholders alleging breach of contract and claiming damages of $108 million. After a seven-day trial, the jury unanimously ruled in favor of William Penn.

Carmody defended investor Dan Loeb and his hedge fund Third Point against allegations that Loeb and other hedge fund managers created a disinformation campaign about Canadian insurance company Fairfax Financial in order to drive down its stock price as part of a short-selling scheme. In 2011, a New Jersey judge dismissed the Canadian insurer’s $6 billion lawsuit.

As co-lead class counsel for the City of Baltimore and Yale University, he represents over-the-counter purchasers in a 2011 antitrust class action suit against financial firms accused of manipulating the London Interbank Offered Rate (LIBOR), the benchmark interest rate used when banks borrow money from one another. As of 2023, $781 million in settlements have been paid to over-the-counter purchasers.

In 2013, he defended L&M Arts, run by Dominique Lévy and Robert Mnuchin, in a $22.4 million breach of contract case alleging art dealers violated a confidentiality agreement in the sale of an untitled 1961 Mark Rothko painting known as the “Red Rothko.” After a federal court jury trial in Dallas, Texas, the court entered a judgment for the plaintiff in the amount of $500,000. The United States Court of Appeals for the Fifth Circuit reversed the judgment and the case was dismissed.

Carmody defended Space Systems/Loral in a lawsuit brought by Viasat alleging more than $1 billion in damages for patent infringement. A jury awarded Viasat $283 million in April 2014, but four months later the judge ordered a new trial on damages. In September 2014, the parties settled the lawsuit, as well as another related lawsuit, for $100 million.

In 2015, he represented David Kester, a whistleblower who claimed drug manufacturer Novartis defrauded Medicare and Medicaid programs by paying pharmacies illegal kickbacks for recommending Novartis drugs. Novartis, Accredo Health Group, and Bioscrip Corporation settled the False Claims Act charges for a total of $465 million.

Hailed “the tech trial of the century,” Carmody was “brought in last-minute to defend Uber,” the ride-hail service, in a 2017 lawsuit brought by Waymo, Google’s self-driving car unit, over theft of trade secrets covering self-driving car technology. While Waymo sought over $2 billion in damages in that case, it settled after 4 days of trial. In exchange for Waymo releasing its claims against Uber, Uber reportedly agreed not to use Waymo's intellectual property in their autonomous car technology and pledged to pay Waymo a settlement of 0.34 percent of Uber equity or $245 million.

In 2017, Carmody represented GE Funding Capital Market Services, a subsidiary of General Electric, in a jury trial against Nebraska Investment Finance Authority (NIFA) over guaranteed investment contracts, obtaining a judgment valued at $161 million.

Carmody served as co-lead counsel for certain California political subdivisions that claimed to be overcharged by wireless carriers Verizon, AT&T, and T-Mobile. A whistleblower, OnTheGoWireless, claimed the defendants violated state false claims acts by not providing contractually required cost-savings opportunities to their government customers. In 2020, the case ended with the defendants paying settlements of $125.8 million.

WeWork co-founder Adam Neumann hired Carmody in his breach of contract lawsuit against SoftBank for cancelling its tender offer to buy $3 billion in WeWork stock. In 2021, before the trial was set to begin, Neumann reached a confidential settlement with SoftBank and reportedly obtained $480 million in addition to $50 million to pay for Neumann’s legal fees.

When dating company Match Group and IAC/InterActiveCorp were sued by the Tinder co-founders in a $2 billion lawsuit for allegedly understating the dating app’s value in 2017, the defendants brought Carmody in shortly before trial. The lawsuit settled during trial in December 2021, with Match Group agreeing to pay $441 million to the plaintiffs and others who had claims in arbitration.

Carmody stepped in as lead counsel for hedge fund manager Louis Bacon in his defamation lawsuit against Canadian fashion executive Peter Nygard. In May 2023, Bacon secured a $203 million judgment. The case is currently on appeal.

In 2024, he served as lead trial attorney in a class action lawsuit representing subscribers against the National Football League (NFL) for violating the antitrust laws with its NFL Sunday Ticket broadcast package. At the close of trial, a federal court jury in Los Angeles decided in favor of the plaintiffs and awarded a verdict of nearly $4.8 billion in damages to the residential and commercial classes. The court later vacated the jury award, citing that expert witnesses had used a flawed methodology to mislead jurors. In October 2026, a federal appeals court reinstated the original verdict holding the NFL liable and sent the case back to district court for a new trial on damages.

Carmody represented the City of Baltimore against opioid manufacturers and distributors. In 2024, he brokered pre-trial settlements for the city in the amount of $427 million. In the only Baltimore opioid case to be tried, the city prevailed with a $266 million jury verdict against the pharmaceutical companies McKesson and AmerisourceBergen. A Maryland judge later reduced the jury award to $52.4 million, found the city was entitled to $100 million in abatement, and entered a judgment of $152.4 million. The judgment was later vacated on appeal.

As co-lead class counsel with attorney David Boies of Boies Schiller Flexner LLP, they got a $425 million jury verdict for the plaintiffs in the class action lawsuit Rodriguez et al v. Google. The lawsuit concerned Google’s collection and retention of data from its users who believed they had opted out of having their private information tracked.

== Personal life ==
He is married to Catherine Gillis Carmody. They live in Miami Beach, Florida, and in Water Mill, New York. In 2023, they sold their condo in New York City for $7.75 million after making Florida their primary residence.
