= Fulbright Tower =

Skyscraper in Houston, Texas

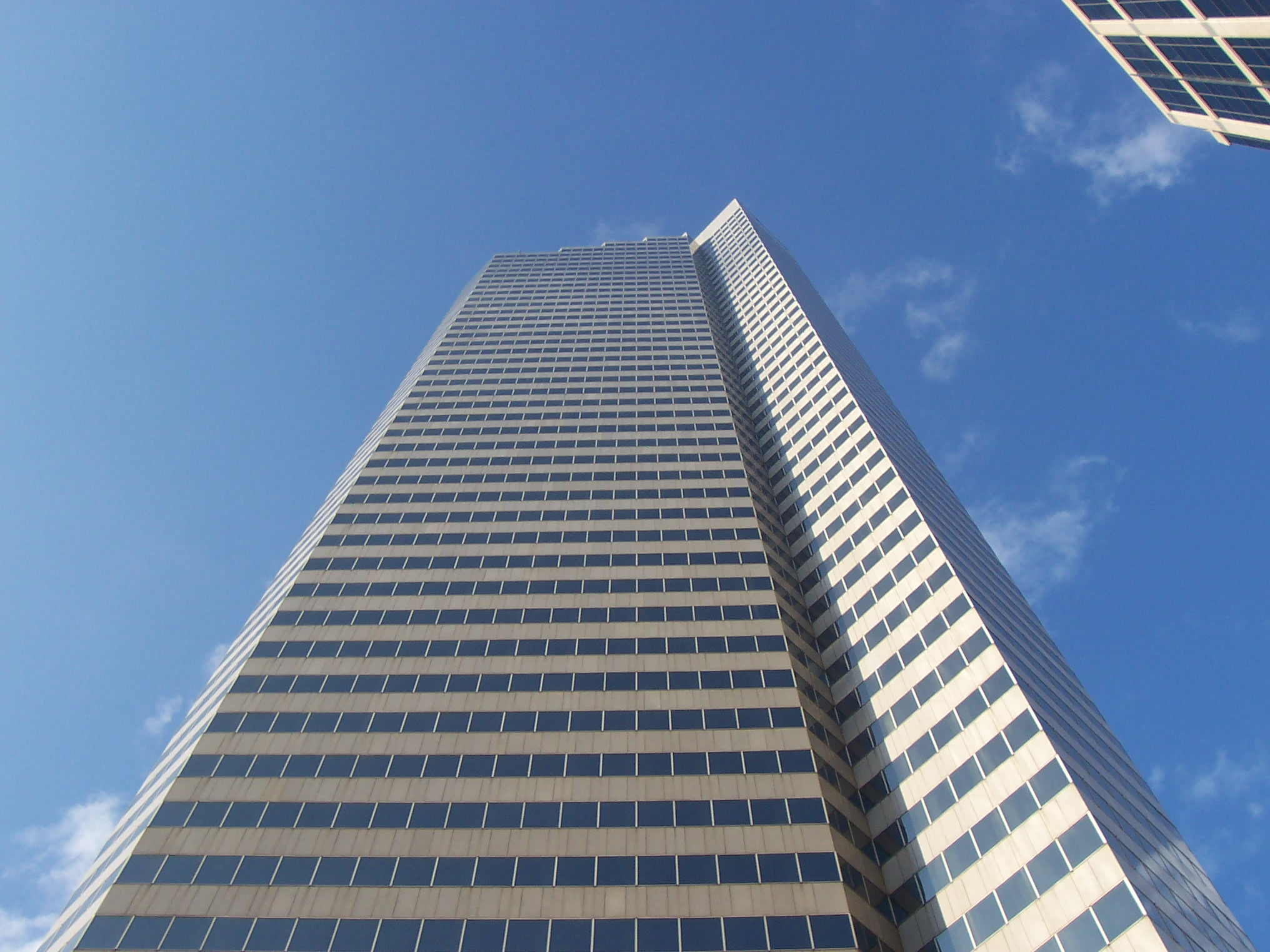

General information
- Location: 1301 McKinney Avenue, Houston, Texas, United States
- Coordinates: 29.75556°N 95.36169°W
- Completed: 1982; 43 years ago

Height
- Roof: 725 ft (221 m)
- Top floor: 679 ft (207 m)

Technical details
- Floor count: 51
- Floor area: 1,483,988 sq ft (137,867.0 m^{2})

Design and construction
- Architect: Caudill Rowlett Scott
- Structural engineer: Walter P. Moore

The Fulbright Tower is a 51-story office skyscraper originally known as 3 Houston Center. A part of the downtown Houston Center complex in Houston, Texas, United States, the tower contains 1,247,061 square feet (115,855.8 m^{2}) of Class A office space. The lower seven levels were designed to support four trading floors for commodities such as electricity and natural gas.

The building was previously owned by ChevronTexaco. As of 2005, Crescent owned the tower in a joint venture with affiliates of GE Asset Management and J.P. Morgan Asset Management.

In October 2023, NRG Energy announced plans to relocate its corporate headquarters to the Fulbright Tower, leasing approximately 245,000 square feet (22,800 m^{2}) across the top ten floors. NRG is undertaking a major renovation of the space, with occupancy planned for 2025.

Norton Rose Fulbright previously maintained its Houston office in the tower before relocating in 2023.

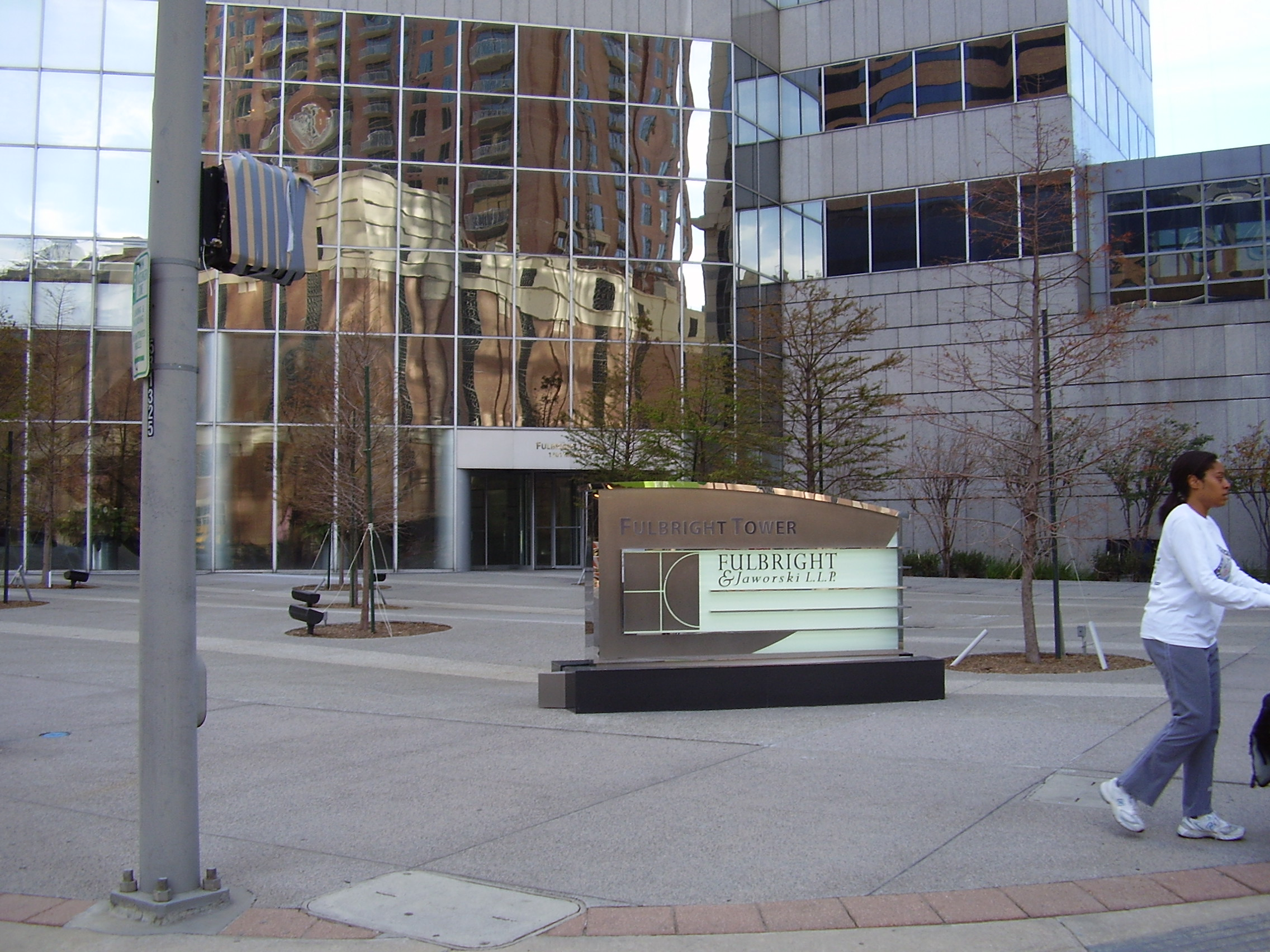

== History ==
Construction on the tower was scheduled to begin in November 1980. The building was built in 1982. The tower property was developed in 1985. Fulbright & Jaworski became a tenant during that year. The original name of the structure was the Gulf Tower. Chevron became the building's main tenant, and its name became the Chevron Tower. Fulbright & Jaworski renegotiated and extended its lease in 2003 and retained the possibility of naming rights; as of 2005, the firm occupies 350,000 square feet (33,000 m^{2}) of space. On February 24, 2005, Crescent completed the joint venture agreement involving the Fulbright Tower; a pension fund investor advised by JPMorgan Asset Management bought a 60% ownership interest in the building and an affiliate of GE Asset Management bought a 16.15% ownership interest. In 2004, ChevronTexaco sold the building to Crescent. During that year the tower was 49% occupied. By March 2005, ChevronTexaco planned to move its operations out of the tower after buying 1500 Louisiana Street in Downtown Houston. Fulbright & Jaworski used their naming rights, and in 2005 the building gained the name Fulbright Tower. In 2005, the Fulbright Tower was 57% occupied. In 2006, Chevron Corporation still occupied three floors at the Fulbright Tower. In 2009 Conway MacKenzie leased 4,619 square feet (429.1 m^{2}) at the Fulbright Tower. Brookfield Properties, which acquired the Houston Center in 2017, began renovating the campus in 2019 alongside architectural firm Gensler. The first phase of the project was completed in 2021 and, as of March 2022, the final phase was underway.

== Tenants ==
- NRG Energy
- Norton Rose Fulbright
- Key Energy Services
- Office of the Comptroller of the Currency

== See also ==
- List of tallest buildings in the United States
