= Consulate General of Japan, Houston =

Japanese diplomatic mission in Houston, Texas

Coordinates: 29°45′23″N 95°21′48″W

Consulate-General of Japan in Houston 在ヒューストン日本国総領事館
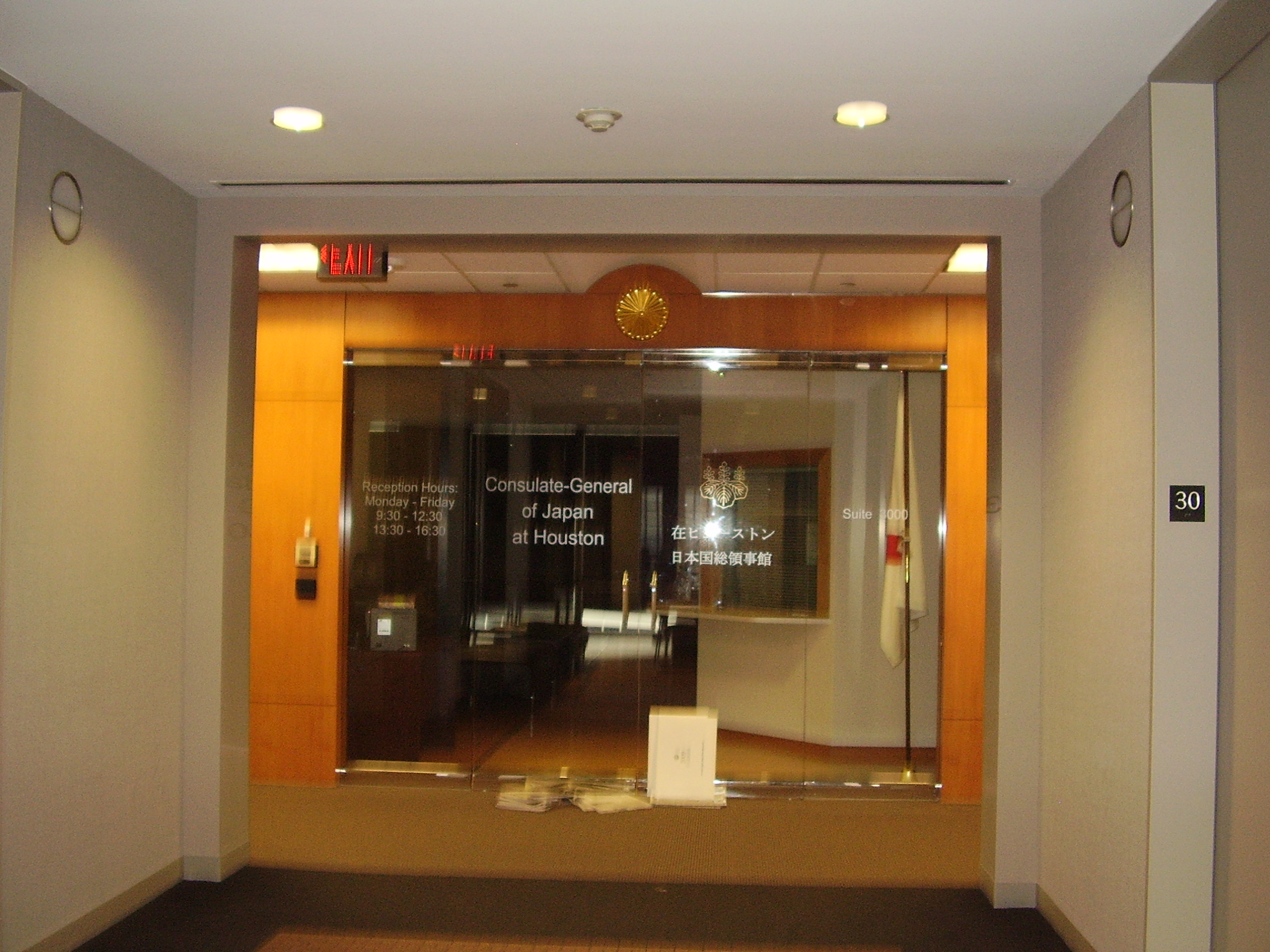
- Location: Houston, Texas, United States
- Address: 900 Fannin Street

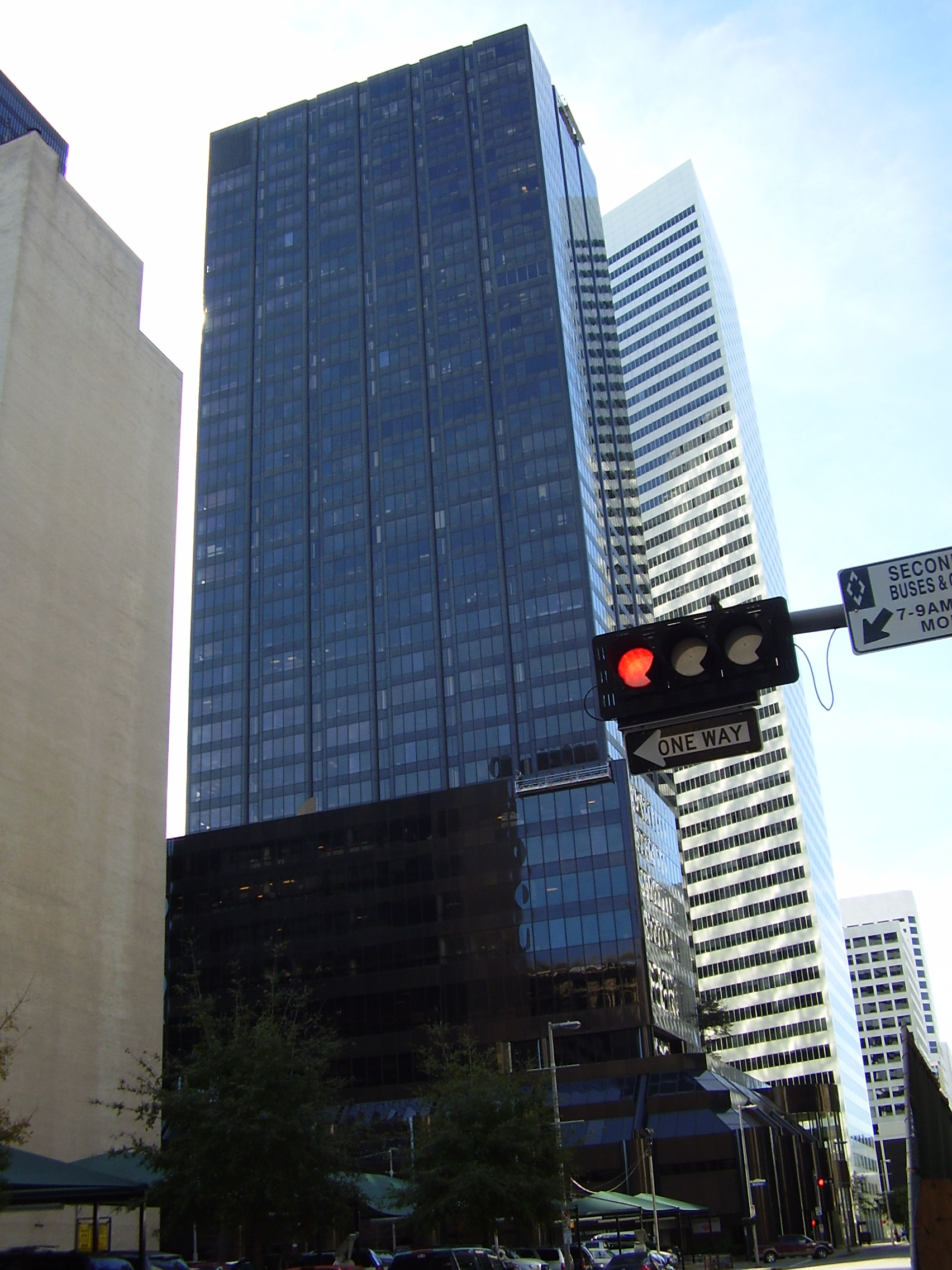
2 Houston Center, the location of the consulate

The Consulate-General of Japan in Houston (在ヒューストン日本国総領事館, Zai Hyūsuton Nippon-koku Sōryōjikan) is Japan's diplomatic facility in Houston, Texas, United States. It is located in Suite 3000 at 2 Houston Center, which is located at 900 Fannin Street in Downtown Houston. The consulate serves Texas and Oklahoma.

As of March 2024, the consul general is Zentaro NAGANUMA (長沼 善太郎, NAGANUMA Zentaro).

== History ==
In the post-World War II period, the consulate restarted operations in 1959. Japanese businesses began subsequently establishing themselves in Houston.

At one point the consulate was located in Suite 5300 and later Suite 2300 in the Wells Fargo Plaza (formerly the First Interstate Bank Plaza).

For a decade ending in 1993 the consulate refused to pay "user fees" billed to the consulate by the City of Piney Point Village in the Greater Houston Area. The consul general residence is in Piney Point Village. The Japanese argued that this was a tax and that diplomatic facilities should not be taxed. In 1993 the city announced that the consulate owed the city around $14,000 United States dollars. The Japanese argued that international agreements exempted consulate facilities from taxes, while Piney Point Village said the annual fees were for user services. James Baker, a Piney Point Village alderman, threatened to suspend garbage pickup services and expose the Japanese consulate to ridicule. In September of that year a U.S. State Department letter stated that consulates should pay legitimate user fees, and that consulates do not have to pay for fire and police services. The consulate paid almost $12,000, including $4,500 in interest, to the city. According to Vice-Consul Takaki Takinami originally the city charged $14,915.52 before changing the invoice and deducting police and fire costs. Shojiro Imanishi (今西 正次郎, Imanishi Shōjirō), who was the outgoing consul-general, agreed to pay $4,500 annually.

== Gallery ==
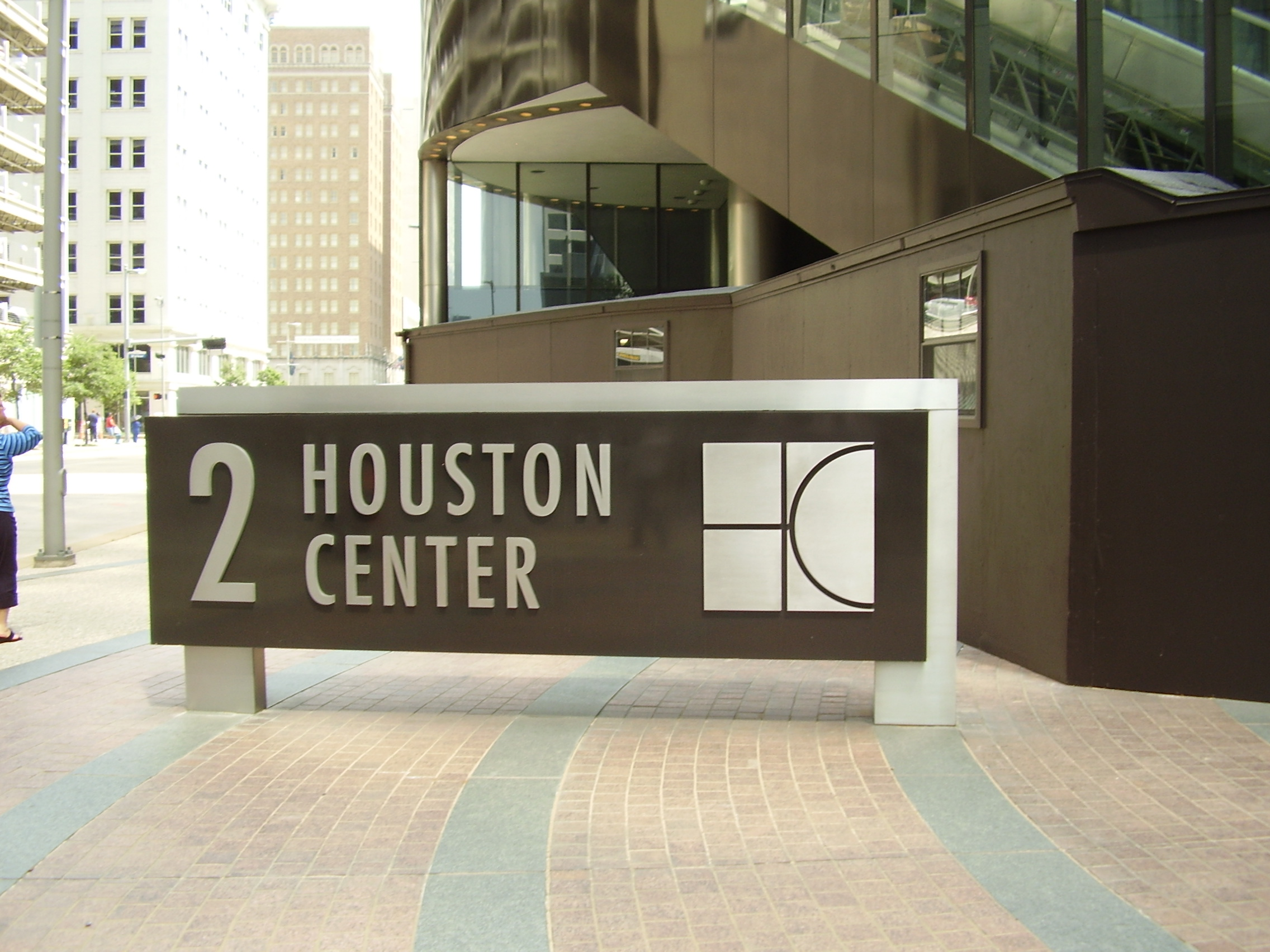
2 Houston Center, the location of the consulate

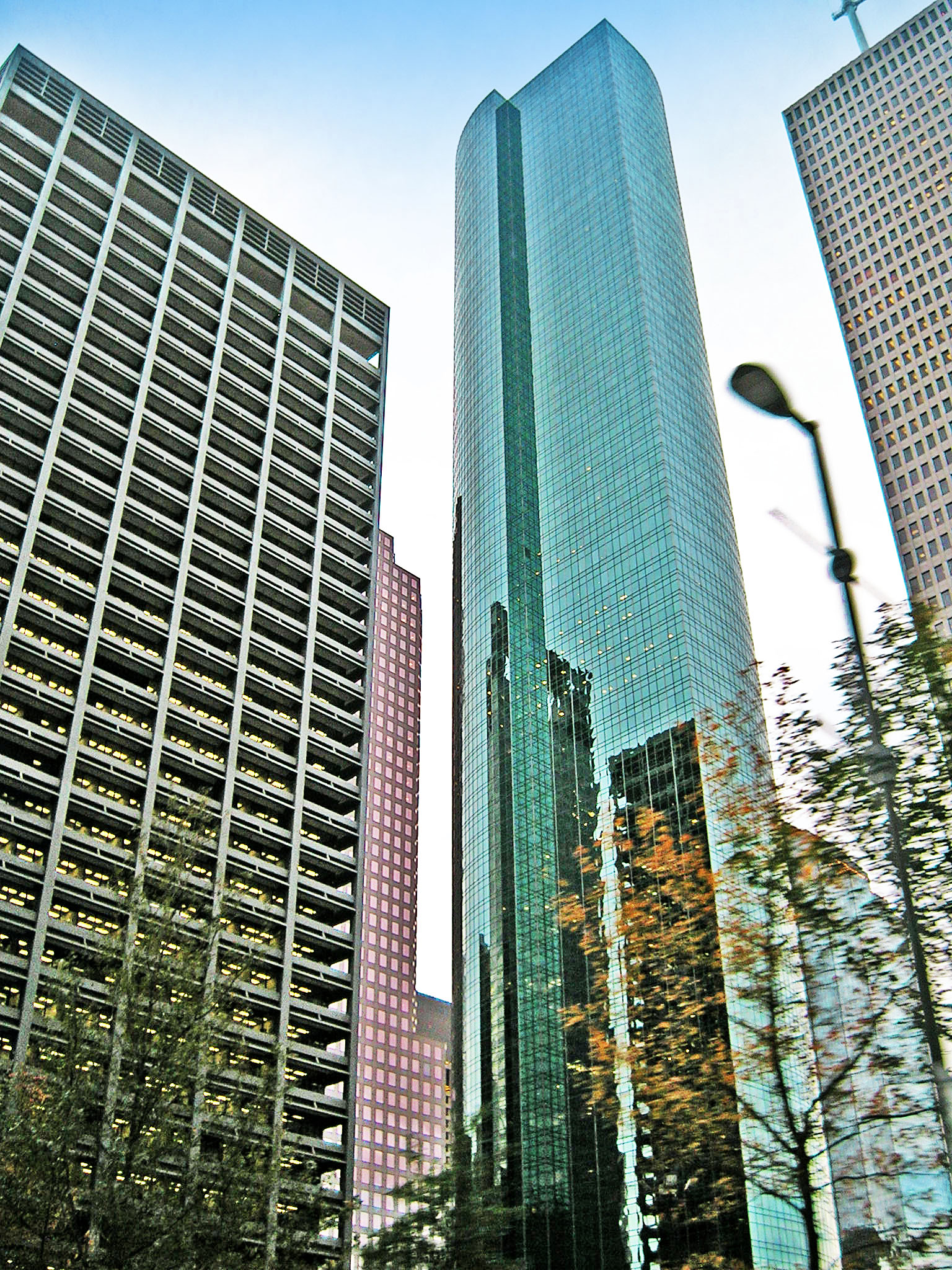
Wells Fargo Plaza, the former location of the consulate

== See also ==
- History of the Japanese in Houston
- Diplomatic missions of Japan
