= 1500 Louisiana Street =

Skyscraper in Houston, Texas

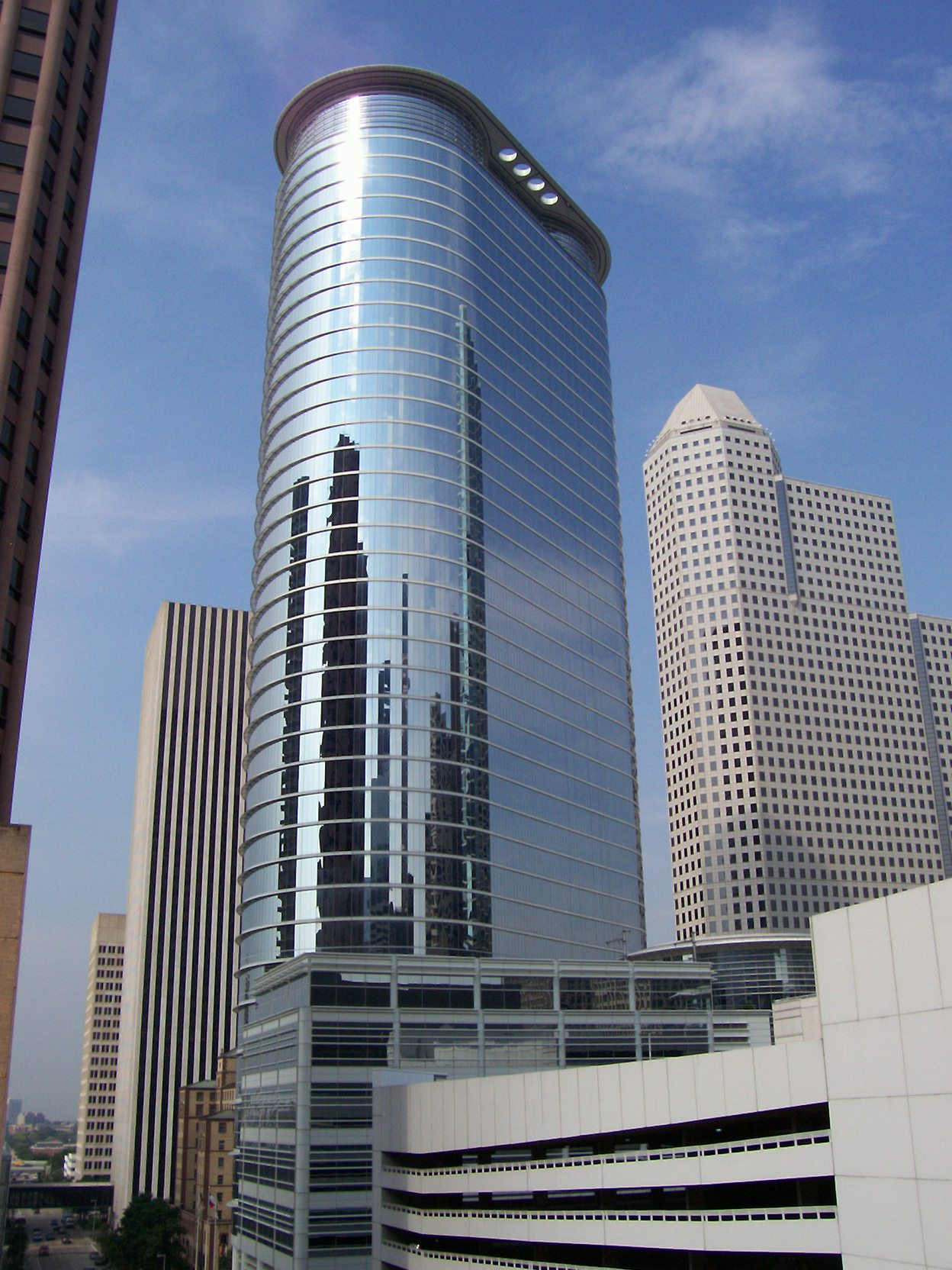
- Interactive map of the 1500 Louisiana Street area

General information
- Type: Office
- Location: 1500 Louisiana Street, Houston, Texas
- Coordinates: 29.75470°N 95.37115°W
- Construction started: 1999
- Completed: 2002
- Cost: $200 million
- Owner: Chevron Corporation

Height
- Roof: 602 ft (183 m)

Technical details
- Floor count: 40
- Floor area: 1,284,013 sq ft (119,288.7 m^{2})

Design and construction
- Architect: Cesar Pelli

1500 Louisiana Street, formerly Enron Center South, is a 600 ft (183m) tall skyscraper in Houston, Texas. It was completed in 2002 and has 40 floors and a total building area of 1,284,013sq.ft. It is the 20th tallest building in the city and the tallest completed in the 2000s. It was designed by César Pelli.

== History ==
After the completion of Heritage Plaza in 1986, no new office skyscraper was built in Houston until the late 1990s. This was caused by the city's high office vacancy rate during the 1980s. As Houston's economy continued to recover in the following decade, demand for new office spaces began to return. In 1999, Enron, a major local company, started the construction of a new office tower for its main headquarters. It is located on the block owned by the company in Downtown Houston. Due to a scandal in late 2001, the company collapsed and filed for bankruptcy that same year; Enron never occupied the building.

In 2002, Intell Management and Investment Co. paid $102 million for the tower, which came equipped with technology that was, in 2003, the latest for energy firms. In 2003, Charlie Giammalva of Lincoln Property Co., the leasing company of 1500 Louisiana, said that the building was "zero percent occupied." Giammalva said that the management of the building had contacted several firms, such as ExxonMobil, about the possibility of leasing space in the building. By July 2003 none of the firms contacted the management.

ChevronTexaco bought the building in 2004 for $340 million. By 2005 the firm announced that it would move out of the former Chevron Tower in Houston Center and moved into 1500 Louisiana Street. In 2006 4,000 employees worked in 1500 Louisiana.

In October 2024, Chevron announced a $66.5 million renovation plan for the building, as well as the $2.9 million restroom renovation project on floors 31–39, which was started a month prior. Both projects were slated to complete in August 2025.

== Design ==
The 40-floor building was designed by César Pelli as a lozenge shaped office skyscraper. The structure has 7 floors of podium and covered with glass curtain wall. It is connected to 1400 Smith Street by a circular skybridge.

== See also ==
- List of tallest buildings in Houston
