= 1400 Smith Street =

Skyscraper in Houston, Texas

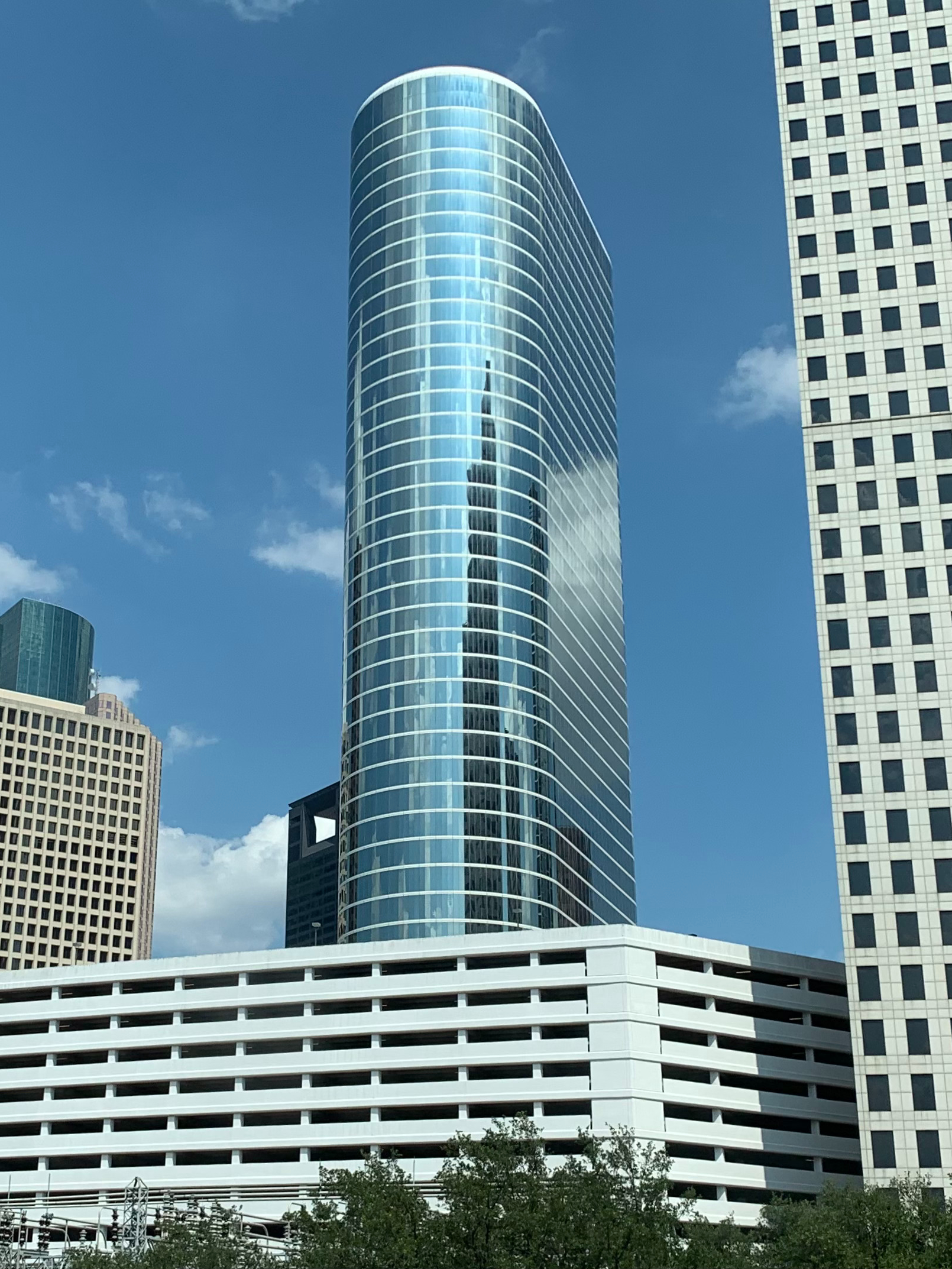
- Interactive map of the 1400 Smith Street area

General information
- Status: Completed
- Location: 1400 Smith Street; Houston, Texas; United States
- Coordinates: 29.75554°N 95.37182°W
- Completed: 1983; 43 years ago
- Owner: Chevron Corporation

Height
- Roof: 691 ft (211 m)

Technical details
- Floor count: 50
- Floor area: 1,266,714 ft^{2} (117,681.6 m^{2})

Design and construction
- Architects: Pelli Clarke Pelli (design); Kendall/Heaton Associates (AoR)
- Structural engineer: CBM Engineers
- Main contractor: Clark Construction

1400 Smith Street (formerly Enron Complex) is a 691 ft (211 m) tall skyscraper located in downtown Houston, Texas, United States. The building has 50 floors and is the 11th tallest building in the city. Designed by architectural firm Lloyd Jones Brewer and Associates, the building was completed in 1983. The 1,200,000-square-foot (110,000 m^{2}) office tower is situated on Houston's six-mile (10 km) pedestrian and retail tunnel system that links many of the city's downtown towers. It was formerly Four Allen Center, a part of the Allen Center complex.

The building was the former headquarters of Enron, one of America's largest commodities trading companies during the 1990s and later infamous for its financial scandal in 2001. 1400 Smith Street was originally known as Four Allen Center prior to Enron relocating to Houston in 1985. Before Enron's collapse, the energy giant constructed a second, similar building across the street, connected to 1400 Smith Street by a circular skywalk.

In 2006, Brookfield Properties acquired the 1,200,000-square-foot (110,000 m^{2}) Four Allen Center for $120 million. At the same time, Brookfield announced that Chevron USA signed a lease for the entire building. Brookfield held 4 Allen Center in a joint partnership with the private equity group The Blackstone Group. As of 2006, the joint venture has 7,400,000 square feet (690,000 m^{2}) of office space in Downtown Houston, making it the largest office owner in the central business district.

Beginning in 2006, Chevron leased the entirety of the building. Earlier in 2011 Brookfield Properties, the owner of the building, searched for a prospective buyer. In June 2011, Chevron bought the building from Brookfield for $340 million. Brookfield confirmed the purchase on June 24, 2011. If Chevron had not fully occupied the building, Brookfield would have put the building on the market, and Holliday Fowler Fenoglio LP would have had the listing.

== See also ==
- Architecture of Houston
- List of tallest buildings in Houston
- List of tallest buildings in Texas
- Enron
