= Four Seasons Hotel Houston =

Hotel in Houston, Texas, United States

Coordinates: 29.7543°N 95.3627°W

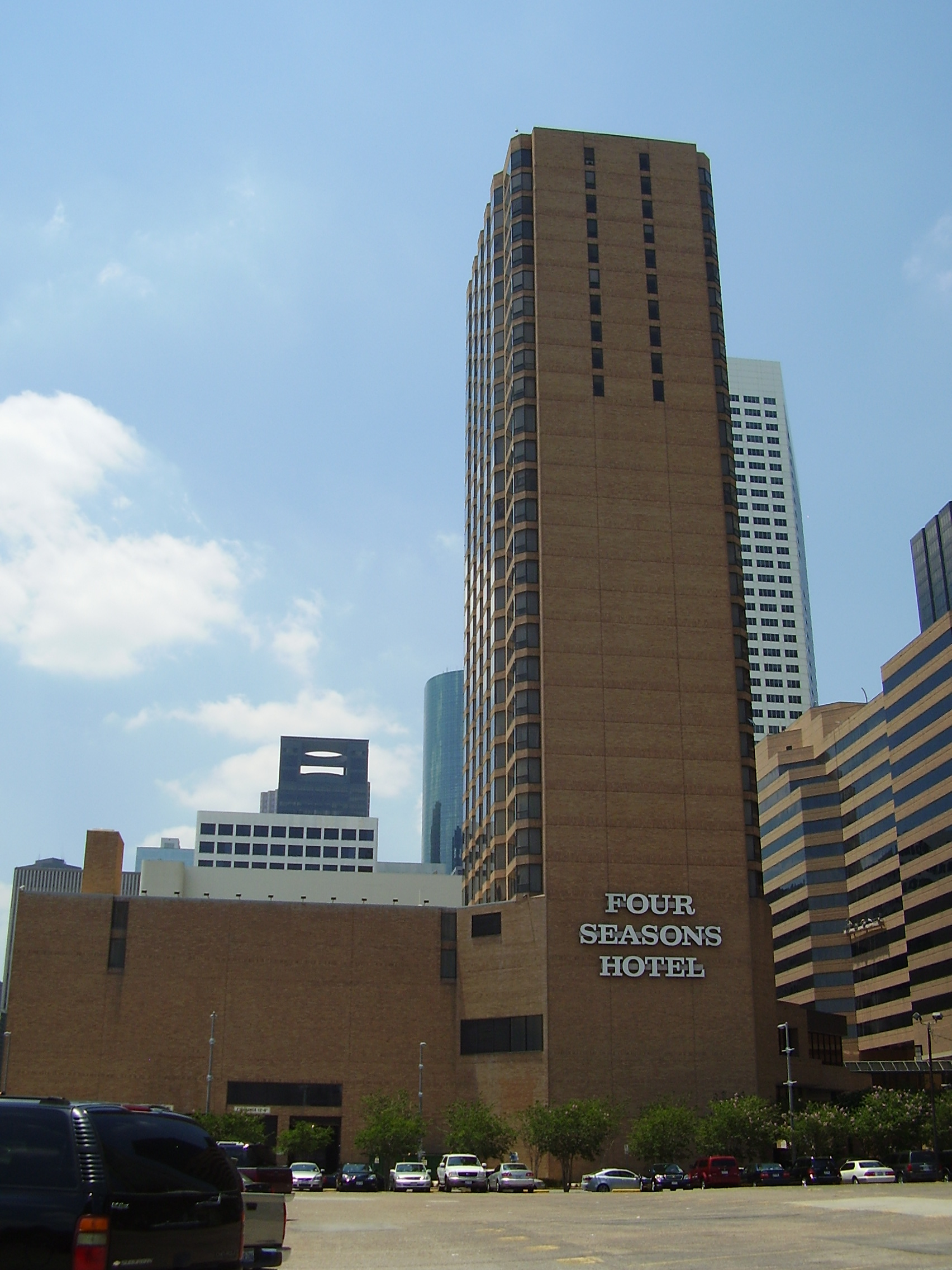
Four Seasons Hotel Houston

Four Seasons Hotel Houston is a hotel in Houston, Texas, United States. It is operated by Four Seasons Hotels and Resorts. The hotel includes Four Seasons Place, a group of 64 apartment units, and an Italian restaurant. It is a part of the Houston Center complex.

== History ==
Four Seasons Hotel Houston opened in 1982. It became the city's first AAA Five-Diamond hotel in 1996. In 2000, Crescent Real Estate Equities, the owner of Houston Center, sold the Four Seasons Hotel Houston to Maritz, Wolff & Co., a hotel investment group, for $105 million.

In 2006, Institutional Investor ranked Four Seasons Hotel Houston the 87th "Best Hotel in the World". The hotel currently houses 404 guest rooms, including 12 suites, throughout 30 floors.

In 2013, Maritz, Wolff & Co. sold the property to Cascade Investment. Four Seasons Hotels and Resorts, owned jointly by Cascade, Kingdom Holding Company and Triples Holdings, will continue to manage the hotel.

== Amenities ==
The hotel has 289 rooms and 115 suites, in addition to 64 apartment units at the Four Seasons Place, a total of 468 guest accommodations.

== Zoned schools ==
The Four Seasons Place apartments are zoned to Houston Independent School District schools. Residents are zoned to Gregory Lincoln Education Center (Grades K-8), and Northside High School (formerly Jefferson Davis High School).

By Spring 2011, Atherton Elementary School and E.O. Smith Education Center were consolidated with a new K-5 campus in the Atherton site. As a result, the building was rezoned from Smith to Gregory Lincoln for the middle school level. Previously it was zoned to Bruce Elementary. As part of rezoning for the 2014–2015 school year, this tower was rezoned from Bruce to Gregory-Lincoln K-8 for elementary school.
