= Susman Godfrey LLP =

Law firm

- Headquarters: Wells Fargo Plaza; Houston, Texas
- No. of offices: 4
- No. of attorneys: 221 (94 partners, 69 associates)
- Major practice areas: Litigation only
- Key people: Kalpana Srinivasan, Vineet Bhatia (managing partners)
- Revenue: US$528 million (2024)
- Date founded: 1980
- Founder: Stephen D. Susman, Gary McGowan, H. Lee Godfrey
- Company type: Limited liability partnership
- Website: www.susmangodfrey.com

Susman Godfrey LLP (formerly known as Susman & McGowan and Susman, Godfrey & McGowan) is an American white-shoe law firm headquartered in Houston, Texas. The firm has additional offices in New York, Los Angeles, and Seattle. It was founded in 1980 and pioneered the concept of a "litigation boutique", gaining a reputation for innovation. It represents clients, both plaintiffs and defendants, on a contingency fee basis or other alternative fee arrangements that incentivize results.

== History ==
The group that eventually became Susman Godfrey was started in 1976 by Stephen Susman as a plaintiff's commercial litigation practice within Mandell & Wright, a small Houston law firm. In 1979, Susman won his first major suit in the Corrugated Container Antitrust case against corrugated box manufacturers accused of fixing prices with a settlement totaling $550 million, then the largest class action settlement in U.S. history.

Following this success, Susman left Mandell & Wright to found Susman & McGowan with fellow attorney Gary McGowan in 1980. The firm started with eight lawyers and focused solely on commercial litigation, becoming a "litigation boutique". "I'm a litigator, I'm not a settler," Susman told a reporter at the New York Times. H. Lee Godfrey, an old friend of Susman's, joined as partner in 1982 and the firm became known as Susman, Godfrey & McGowan. McGowan left the partnership in 1989. The firm then became known as Susman Godfrey.

Lee Godfrey remained a co-managing partner until he retired in 2013. That same year, attorney Neal Manne was elected as the firm's third managing partner. Stephen Susman continued as a co-managing partner until 2020, when he was injured in a freak bicycle accident and later died of the COVID-19 virus due to complications with his recovery, including diminished lung capacity.

Kalpana Srinivasan was elected the fourth managing partner in 2020 and became the first woman to serve in the position. In 2021, Neal Manne stepped down from managing partner and Vineet Bhatia was elected to serve as co-managing partner alongside Srinivasan. As of 2026, hourly billing rates for top attorneys at Susman Godfrey reached $4,000 an hour.

=== Targeting by the second Trump administration ===
In April 2025, Susman Godfrey was part of a group of top law firms targeted by President Trump through a series of executive orders. EO 14263 claimed that Susman Godfrey "spearheads efforts to weaponize the American legal system and degrade the quality of American elections," among other allegations, and imposed penalties, such as suspending active government security clearances, and limiting access to federal government buildings for Susman employees. The firm filed a complaint against the executive order and later sought a temporary restraining order. In June 2025, Judge Loren L. AliKhan of the Federal District Court for the District of Columbia found that the executive order was unconstitutional, noting, "The order was one in a series attacking firms that had taken positions with which President Trump disagreed." The decision permanently barred the government from enforcing the terms of its executive order. In a statement released following the ruling, Susman Godfrey stated, "The Court's ruling is a resounding victory for the rule of law and the right of every American to be represented by legal counsel without fear of retaliation."

==== ABA v. Executive Office of the President ====
On June 16, 2025, the firm filed American Bar Association v. Executive Office of the President on behalf of the American Bar Association (ABA), alleging that executive orders issued against law firms, and other actions, reflect a "law firm intimidation policy" of the Trump administration, which aims "to intimidate and coerce law firms and lawyers to refrain from challenging the President or his Administration in court, or from even speaking publicly in support of policies or causes that the President does not like."

A year later, on July 20, 2026, the U.S. Department of Justice (DOJ) requested that the court disqualify Susman Godfrey from its representation of the ABA, citing a conflict of interest due to the firm having been the specific target of the defeated 2025 EO 14263. The DOJ also then subpoenaed the firm, among the 14 law firms that were each targeted by the White House in 2025, seeking documents and depositions, in preparing its defense of the Trump administration against the ABA suit.

== Notable cases ==
=== 1980–2010 ===
After the Corrugated Container case, other notable cases won by Steve Susman include a $536 million jury verdict on a counterclaim in El Paso Natural Gas Co. v. GHR Energy Corp in 1988, a $1.1 billion settlement in the breach of contract case Samsung Electronics v. Texas Instruments in 1996 on behalf of Texas Instruments, and a $140 million jury verdict for the plaintiff in Masimo v. Tyco Healthcare Group in 2005.

The Hunt Brothers, scions of an oil fortune, hired Susman in 1986 to take over their $1.5 billion lending-fraud lawsuits against 22 banks that they alleged conspired to bankrupt their companies, Placid Oil Company and Penrod Drilling Company.

In 1989, Susman represented Jim Wright, the 48th speaker of the United States House of Representatives, against charges made by the House ethics committee that Wright had violated House ethics rules, such as accepting improper gifts. Wright later resigned. Susman also represented software company Caldera Inc. in an antitrust lawsuit against Microsoft. In 2000, Microsoft reportedly agreed to pay an estimated settlement of $275 million to Caldera.

Lee Godfrey handled several high-profile cases for the firm, representing Northrup in a case contesting an aborted sale of F-18 fighter jets, Gulf Oil Corporation pension holders who were concerned about the invasion of their pension fund, the Kentucky Speedway in an antitrust case against NASCAR, and shareholders of American Shell Oil Company opposing Royal Dutch Shell's going-private transaction.

=== 2011–present ===
Stephen Susman and co-trial counsel Marc Seltzer represented Frank McCourt, former owner of the Los Angeles Dodgers, in his divorce from Jamie McCourt, which was finalized in 2012. It was reportedly "one of the costliest splits in California history".

In 2017, in what has been called "the tech trial of the century", Waymo, Google's self-driving car company, sued Uber, the ride-hail service, for theft of trade secrets covering self-driving car technology. Susman Godfrey, led by partner Bill Carmody, was Uber's lead counsel at trial. The parties settled after 4 days of trial. As part of the settlement, Uber agreed that it would not use Waymo's hardware or software intellectual property in their autonomous car technology. The company also committed to paying Waymo a settlement of 0.34 percent of Uber equity, worth roughly $245 million.

HouseCanary, a tech startup that develops real estate analytics software, won a $706.2 million jury verdict against Amrock, an affiliate of Quicken Loans, over misappropriated trade secrets and a breach of contract in 2018. Susman Godfrey, led by partners Max Tribble and Kalpana Srinivasan, represented HouseCanary in a 7-week trial, which ended with the jury ruling that Quicken pay HouseCanary $235.4 million in damages for misappropriation of the trade secrets and fraud claims and an additional $471.4 million in punitive damages. In March 2026, a jury awarded HouseCanary $175 million in compensatory damages, which Tribble noted would amount to more than $260 million with prejudgment interest. The company filed for bankruptcy in September 2026 to buy itself time to collect the damages payment.

As part of the firm's pro bono work, partner Neal Manne represented Alfred Dewayne Brown in a lawsuit against the Texas Comptroller's office after it denied Brown compensation for his wrongful conviction for the 2003 killing of a policeman. Brown served 12 years in prison on death row until his conviction was overturned in 2014 after evidence that supported his alibi was discovered. In 2020, the Texas Supreme Court ruled that the state agency shouldn't have denied compensation to Brown, who was eligible for nearly $2 million. "Now I think (Brown) can finally close this chapter of his life knowing that the very highest court in Texas unanimously agreed he was treated wrongly," Manne said of the judgment.

Susman Godfrey represented WeWork co-founder Adam Neumann in a breach of contract suit against SoftBank, reportedly getting a $480 million settlement in 2021 as well as $50 million to cover Neumann's legal fees.

Dominion Voting Systems launched a $1.6 billion defamation lawsuit against Fox News in 2021 (Dominion Voting Systems v. Fox News Network) over lies the media company and its anchors spread about Dominion voting machines during the 2020 presidential election. Several Fox programs broadcast false statements that Dominion machines had been rigged to steal votes from then-president Donald Trump in favor of his Democratic opponent Joe Biden. Susman Godfrey, led by partners Davida Brook, Justin Nelson, and Stephen Shackelford, represented Dominion Voting Systems and secured a historic $787.5 million settlement with Fox just before the trial was set to begin in Delaware Superior Court. It is one of the largest defamation settlements in U.S. history. After the settlement was struck, Shackelford told MSNBC, "The number itself also helps them [Dominion employees] prove to the world exactly what Fox did and that Fox is taking some measure of accountability for it." Susman Godfrey also led similar litigation against Mike Lindell, Patrick Byrne, Rudy Giuliani, and Sidney Powell.

The firm represented subscribers in a class action lawsuit against the National Football League (NFL) because the league violated antitrust laws with its NFL Sunday Ticket broadcast package. An 8-person jury ruled in favor of the plaintiffs, awarding nearly $4.8 billion to 2.4 million residential and 48,000 commercial subscribers from 2011 to 2022. "It's a great verdict for the consumers of America," Bill Carmody, plaintiff's lead trial attorney, told reporters, noting that the jury upheld antitrust laws "despite the star power of the defendants". In August 2024, a court vacated the $4.8 billion award, citing that expert witnesses had used a flawed methodology to mislead jurors. A federal appeals court reinstated the original verdict holding the NFL liable in October 2026, sending the case back to district court for a new trial on damages.

When the City of Baltimore opted out of national litigation against pharmaceutical companies responsible for the opioid epidemic, it partnered with Susman Godfrey to bring individual suits against multiple opioid manufacturers and distributors. In 2024, the firm secured $427.5 million in pre-trial settlements for the City. Then the firm won a $266 million jury verdict against McKesson and AmerisourceBergen, in the only Baltimore case to be tried. The jury found the defendants responsible for 97% of the harm from opioids experienced by the City of Baltimore from 2011 through the future date of 2029. Maryland Circuit Court Judge Lawerence Fletcher-Hill reduced the award to $52.4 million and later determined the City was entitled to $100 million in abatement and entered judgment for $152.4 million. The judgment was later vacated on appeal.

In 2025, partners Shawn Rabin and Krysta Pachman led an arbitration on behalf of PWNHealth, now known as Everly Health, in a contract and Lanham Act dispute with Walgreens over COVID-19 testing, obtaining an award of $987 million. Walgreens challenged the decision in a federal district court in Delaware, where it was upheld. To avoid the cost of accrual of post-award interest on the arbitration award, Walgreens entered into a settlement agreement for $595 million.

The firm, led by partner Jacob Buchdahl, won a $1.6 billion judgment in a bench trial for BML Properties in 2025 in its fraud suit against China Construction America Inc. over delays that sabotaged the company's Baha Mar resort in the Bahamas.

In one of the largest copyright settlements involving generative artificial intelligence, Anthropic AI agreed, in 2025, to pay a $1.5 billion settlement to a group of authors and publishers for downloading and storing millions of copyrighted books. As co-lead class counsel, Susman Godfrey represented the plaintiffs of the class action lawsuit. The settlement is the largest payout—$3,000 per work to 500,000 authors— to date in the history of U.S. copyright cases.

== Recognition ==
Vault Law, which ranks the top law firms in the United States annually, has consistently ranked Susman Godfrey the #1 Best Litigation Specialty Law Firm since the designation was created in 2011.

The American Lawyer jointly named Susman Godfrey Law Firm of the Year in 2025, among eight firms, four of which were honored for successful challenges to executive orders, and four others for legal representations of those firms.
