= Richard Beckler =

American lawyer

- Born: Richard William Beckler; March 30, 1940; Brooklyn, New York, U.S.
- Died: September 25, 2017 (aged 77); Los Angeles, California, U.S.
- Education: Williams College (BA); Fordham University School of Law (JD)
- Occupation: Lawyer

Richard W. Beckler (30 March 1940 – 25 September 2017) was an attorney. He served a number of prominent clients. At the time of his death in late September, 2017, he had been appointed as General Counsel of the US General Services Administration.

After his death, Beckler's actions at the GSA were discussed in the US national media when it was revealed that the GSA had supplied the special counsel investigation by Robert Mueller with copies of more than 5000 emails sent by the Trump administration transition team. GSA Deputy Counsel Lenny Loewentritt, stated that Beckler had not made a commitment to the transition team that law enforcement materials requests would be routed through transition lawyers. Reuters reported statements that "The FBI had requested the materials from GSA staff on Aug. 23, asking for copies of the emails, laptops, cell phones and other materials associated with nine members of the Trump transition team responsible for national security and policy matters".

== Early life ==
Beckler was born in Brooklyn, New York on 30 March 1940, the child of William Beckler and Mary (Lohrmann) Beckler. He had an older sister named Beth.

Beckler was educated at Williams College (BA), where he played lacrosse and majored in history, and Fordham University School of Law (JD).

Richard Beckler served in the U.S. Navy, Active Duty Officer from 1962 to 1970 and as Lieutenant Commander in the U.S. Naval Reserve (1965–1978).

Richard Beckler served as Assistant District Attorney in the NY (Manhattan) County District Attorney's Office under District Attorney Frank Hogan (1968–1972). Beckler joined the U.S. Department of Justice, Fraud Section, in 1972. Beckler was promoted to and served as the Section Chief of the Criminal Fraud Section of the U.S. Department of Justice 1976–1979, where he headed a task force on foreign payment cases and worked closely with officials from the Department of the Treasury, the SEC and the Department of State.

Mr. Beckler joined Fulbright & Jaworski as Head of the Washington Litigation Group from 1979 to 2003. He spent the next 37 years in white collar criminal defense for the firms Fulbright & Jaworski, Howrey LLP, and Bracewell & Giuliani mostly representing corporations such as Halliburton. Beckler also represented many individuals, including CIA Director William J. Casey. Beckler had also represented Iran-Contra figure John Poindexter. Before coming to the GSA, Beckler was a partner and head of litigation in Washington, D.C., for the international law firm Bracewell LLP.

Mr. Beckler's appointment as GSA General Counsel was announced on May 12, 2017.

== Hospitalization & death ==
Beckler was hospitalized in September 2017 and died on 25 September, 2017, in Los Angeles. A memorial website reported that Beckler had died after "a grueling two-month battle with Pancreatic cancer".
