= Ellen Susman =

American journalist (born 1950)

Ellen Spencer
- Born: October 16, 1950 (age 75)
- Occupations: Television journalist, anchor, host, producer and moderator.
- Known for: Former director, US Department of State Art in Embassies Program
- Notable work: Balancing Your Life with Ellen Susman; Philadelphia's KYW-TV Evening/PM Magazine host;
- Spouse: Stephen Susman (m. 1999; died 2020)
- Children: 2 children, 2 stepchildren

Ellen Spencer Susman (born October 16, 1950) is an American journalist, philanthropist, political appointee and television producer. She was nominated by Barack Obama in September 2011 to serve as a member of his Advisory Committee on the Arts for the John F. Kennedy Center for the Performing Arts. She served from 2013 to 2016 as the director of the United States Department of State Art in Embassies Program, a public-private partnership of American and international artists, collectors, galleries, foundations, museums and universities.

== Life and education ==
Susman attended the George School in Newtown, PA and Stuart Country Day School in Princeton, NJ. Her father was president of Spencer Industries, a family-owned company in Princeton, NJ that manufactured boys' and men's clothes for large retailers. She graduated from Briarcliff College in 1972 with a B.A. in English.

She married Stephen Susman, a trial attorney, in 1999. She lives part-time in Houston, Texas and New York City, formerly with her husband; he died of COVID-19 on July 14, 2020.

Susman is an accomplished equestrian and owns and exhibits American Saddlebred horses, an avocation shared with her mother, Babette Spencer Santarelli Williams, a recognized equitation instructor and trainer of American Saddlebreds.

== Early career ==
A former broadcast journalist, Susman began her career in 1977 at KYW-TV, a Westinghouse Broadcasting station in Philadelphia, Pennsylvania, hosting Evening/PM Magazine. In 1994, she created, produced and hosted The Aspen Institute Television Show, which "featured guests from government, business and media for discussions about leadership."

In 2001, Susman hosted The Myth of Superwoman, a conference that focused on the balancing act women face in their personal and career lives. Widespread interest in this issue led her to produce and host Superwoman Central, a public television show that aired on Houston PBS in 2005.

In 2007, Susman created and produced Balancing Your Life, a program broadcast nationally on PBS that addressed the challenges of managing career and family. Filmed on location throughout the country, the program featured interviews with prominent and professionally diverse guests, including Chris Evert, Frances Beinecke, Nell Merlino, Janet Gurwitch, Cindy Pawlcyn, Consuelo Mack, Eileen Collins, Sue Naegle, Kuki Gallman, Kavita Ramdas, Maria Blanco and Dana Buchman. Her interview with Rosanne Cash was nominated for a 2007 Lone Star EMMY Award for Outstanding Achievement Interview/Discussion.

Susman edited Danger Pay: Memoir of a Photojournalist in the Middle East, written by her late sister, Carol Spencer Mitchell (1954–2004). The memoir was published in November 2008 by University of Texas Press, and was selected by the 2009 University Press Books Committee as an outstanding-rated title essential to most public and secondary school libraries. Susman collaborated with museum curator Anne Wilkes Tucker to create the Carol Spencer Mitchell Photographic Archive, which consists of approximately 60,000 photos and is housed at the Dolph Briscoe Center for American History.

Susman has served on the Boards of Annie's List, National Jewish Democratic Council, American Leadership Forum in Houston, Recipe for Success, the Texas Tribune, the Democracy Alliance, and the Blanton Museum of Art. She has been an Advisory Council Member of the United States Public Service Academy and the University of Houston Friends of Women's Studies and serves on the National Councils of the Aspen Art Museum and the Whitney Museum of American Art. She currently serves on the Rothko Chapel board of directors and The University of Texas Health Science Center at Houston (UTHealth) Development board. Susman was one of the recipients of the 2025 Hirshhorn National Arts Award, presented to women whose contributions are central to the cultural life of the nation.

== Political career ==
In 2013, Susman co-founded The Texas Future Project, a fund-raising corporation that focuses on policy as well as politics. A Texas art collector and philanthropist, Susman contributed $100,000 to the super PAC supporting candidate Obama and indicated an interest in the directorship of the Art In Embassies Program. During his presidential campaign, Susman raised $1.1 million for Obama, more than any other woman in Texas.

During her tenure as director at Art In Embassies, Susman focused on developing innovative new partnerships in both the public and private sectors expanding the profile, collection, and outreach efforts; bringing artists to South Africa, Rome, Berlin, London, Bern, Doha and The Hague, among others; forming partnerships with the Institute of American Indian Arts to create a portfolio of work for new American Embassies; and furthering Ambassadors' outreach in their respective host country communities.

She also expanded the program by partnering with Ambassador Patrick Gaspard to bring U.S. artists to South Africa, fulfilling the program's mission to create international dialogue and transform lives through art. This relationship led to an opportunity for Ambassador Gaspard to participate with other ambassadors and artists in a program at the Aspen Institute titled Cultural Diplomacy: Why Art Matters, which Susman facilitated.

From 2011 to 2012, Susman served on the President's Advisory Committee on the Arts for the John F. Kennedy Center for the Performing Arts.

== Philanthropy ==
Ellen Susman is president of the Susman Family Foundation, which funds various charitable causes involving the arts, environment and social justice. In 2010, the foundation gave $5 million to the University of Texas Law School, and, in 2011, donated $11 million to the Yale University Art Gallery.
