= Houston Center =

Building complex in Houston, Texas

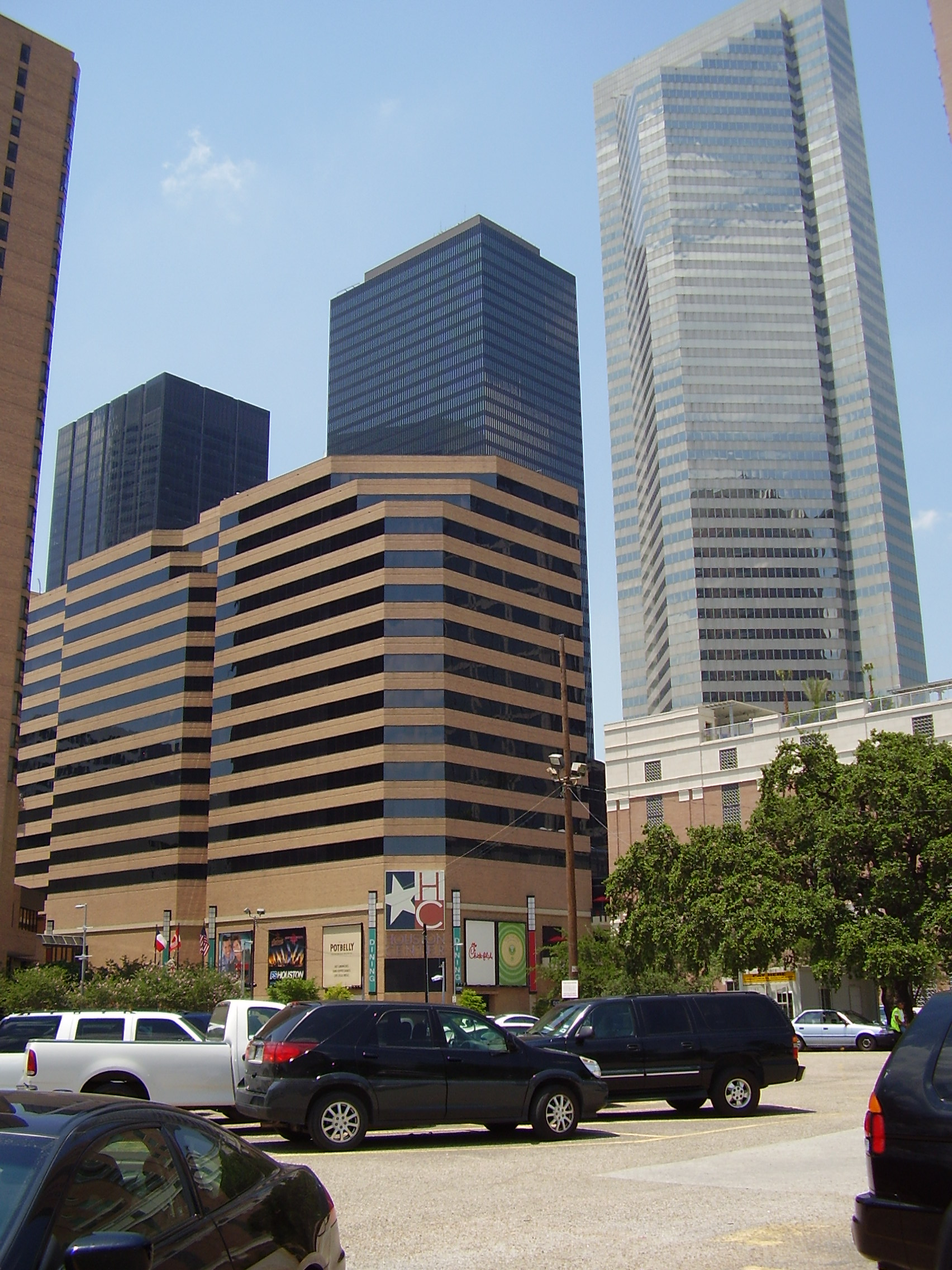
The Houston Center complex

Houston Center is a retail and office complex in Downtown Houston, Texas, United States. It is owned by Australian Super, and managed by Stream Realty Partners.

The three towers in Houston Center have almost 3,400,000 square feet (320,000 m^{2}) of Class A office space. The buildings in Houston Center include:

- LyondellBasell Tower (formerly 1 Houston Center)
- 2 Houston Center
- Fulbright Tower (formerly 3 Houston Center)
- 4 Houston Center
- 5 Houston Center (individually owned)
- The Highlight at Houston Center (formerly The Shops in Houston Center and previously The Park Shops)
  - The Shops, built in 1982, is an enclosed shopping mall.
- Four Seasons Hotel Houston

== History ==
Texas Eastern Corporation bought 32 blocks of land in Downtown Houston for $50 million. Texas Eastern razed the existing buildings and proposed building Houston Center, a large office space development. Texas Eastern planned to build elevated walkways, people movers, and underground garages. Houston Center was one of the largest private development projects ever, however only a small portion of the plan was realized, leaving a large swath of downtown Houston covered in parking lots and vacant land. Panhandle Eastern Corporation acquired Houston Center when Texas Eastern was sold to Panhandle for $2.5 billion in stock in June 1989. Later that year Panhandle sold Houston Center to JMB Realty for $400 million; Panhandle planned to use the money from the sale to reduce its debt, which it accumulated from the merger. Panhandle planned to move out of the 900,000 square feet (84,000 m^{2}) of office space that it occupied in Houston Center and move its operations and 1,300 employees at Houston Center to its corporate headquarters near the Uptown District. Panhandle planned to move in increments over a three-year period after 1989, with one third of its Houston Center workforce moving each year. In 1989 Houston Center consisted of three office buildings and one hotel. Its occupancy rate in December 1989 was about 90%.

Crescent purchased Houston Center in 1997 for $328 million. In 2000 Crescent sold the Four Seasons Hotel Houston, a hotel that is a part of Houston Center, to Maritz, Wolff & Co., a hotel investment group, for $105 million.

In October 2002 Houston Center was 95% leased.

In 2004 Crescent attempted to sell a 50% equity position in both Greenway Plaza and Houston Center. During that year the Class A office space in the entire complex was 94% leased. In addition, in 2004 many of the 32 blocks that were originally scheduled to be a part of the Houston Center development remained undeveloped.

In 2009 Castle Brands (USA) Corp., R.F. Borghese, LLC, Bennett G. Fisher, and Third Planet Windpower, LLC renewed their leases in their sections of Houston Center. Together they held 6,758 square feet (627.8 m^{2}) of space.

In September 2017 Houston Center's offices were 75% leased and its retail area was 70% leased. In December of that year Brookfield Property Partners finalized plans to buy the center.

== LyondellBasell Tower ==
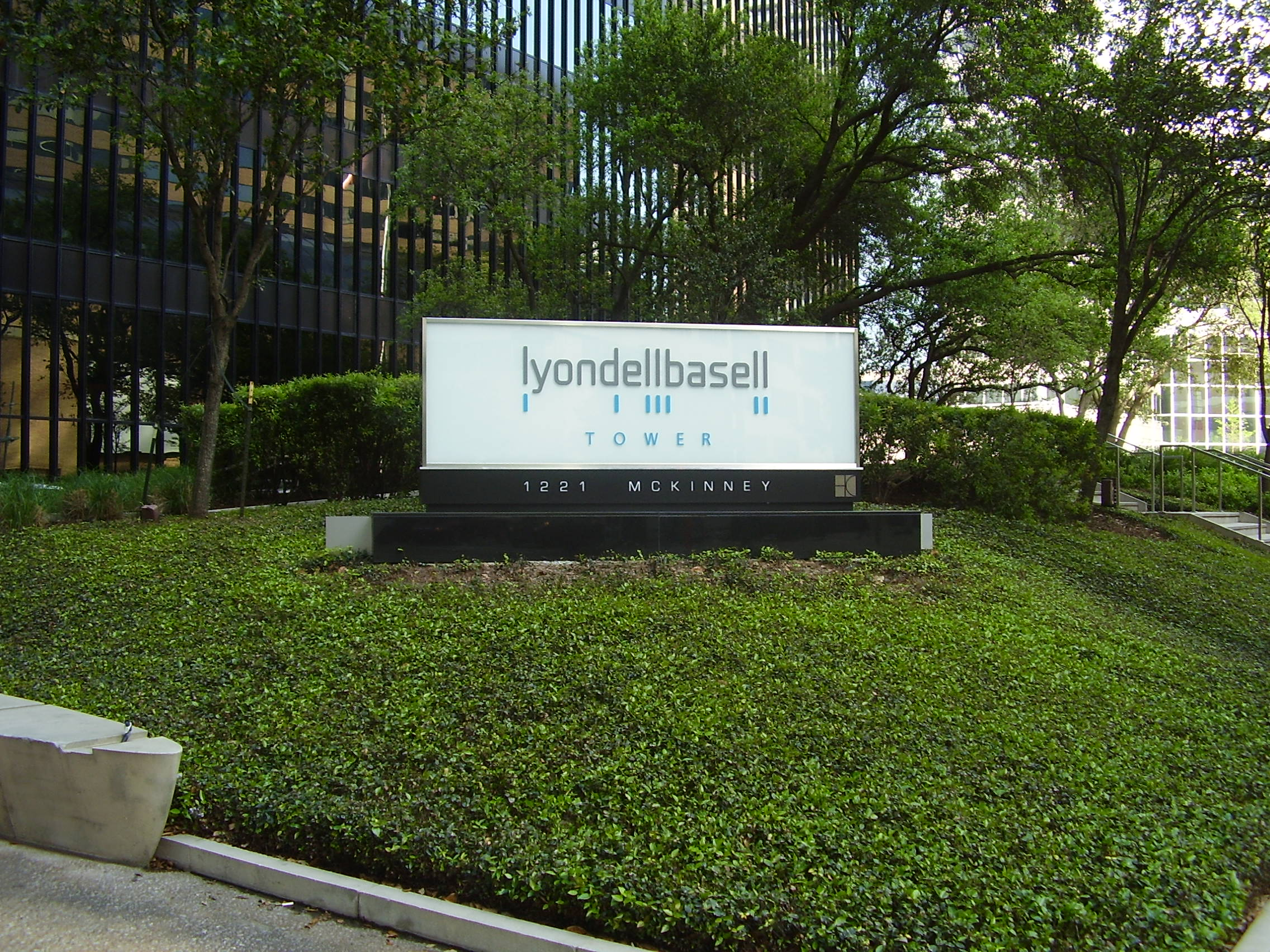
LyondellBasell Tower

Opened in 1978, this building, originally called 1 Houston Center, has 46 floors with Class A office space and is located at 1200 block of McKinney Street. The building is 678 feet (207 m) tall. It was designed by Caudill Rowlett Scott and built by W.S. Bellows Construction. LyondellBasell maintained its Houston offices at 1 Houston Center until March 2025, when the company relocated its corporate headquarters to Williams Tower, situated in the Uptown District of Houston. When Lyondell was an independent company, its headquarters were in 1 Houston Center. As of January 2012, the Lyondell/LyondellBasell operation has been at 1 Houston Center for 25 years.

In 1999 Merrill Lynch Capital Markets expanded its lease to 23,520 square feet (2,185 m^{2}). In 2000 Ernst & Young occupied 140,000 square feet (13,000 m^{2}) of space on five floors in 1 Houston Center. When 5 Houston Center opened in 2003, Ernst & Young pulled its operations from 1 Houston Center and moved them into 5 Houston Center, leaving 100,000 square feet (9,300 m^{2}) of space in 1 Houston Center vacant. Two of the five floors that Ernst & Young left behind were leased to other firms by July 2003. Cozen O'Connor opened an office in 1 Houston Center in 2004. On November 22, 2005, Alain Robert, a French rock and urban climber nicknamed "Spider-Man", was arrested attempting to climb the building. In 2008 the law firm Fish & Richardson opened an office in 1 Houston Center on October 1, 2008. As of 2010 Haynes and Boone has an office in 1 Houston Center.

As of January 2012, the tower was given its current name, the LyondellBasell Tower. Around that time, LyondellBasell renewed its lease for 358,138 square feet (33,272.1 m^{2}) of space in 1 Houston Center.

== 2 Houston Center ==
Two Houston Center
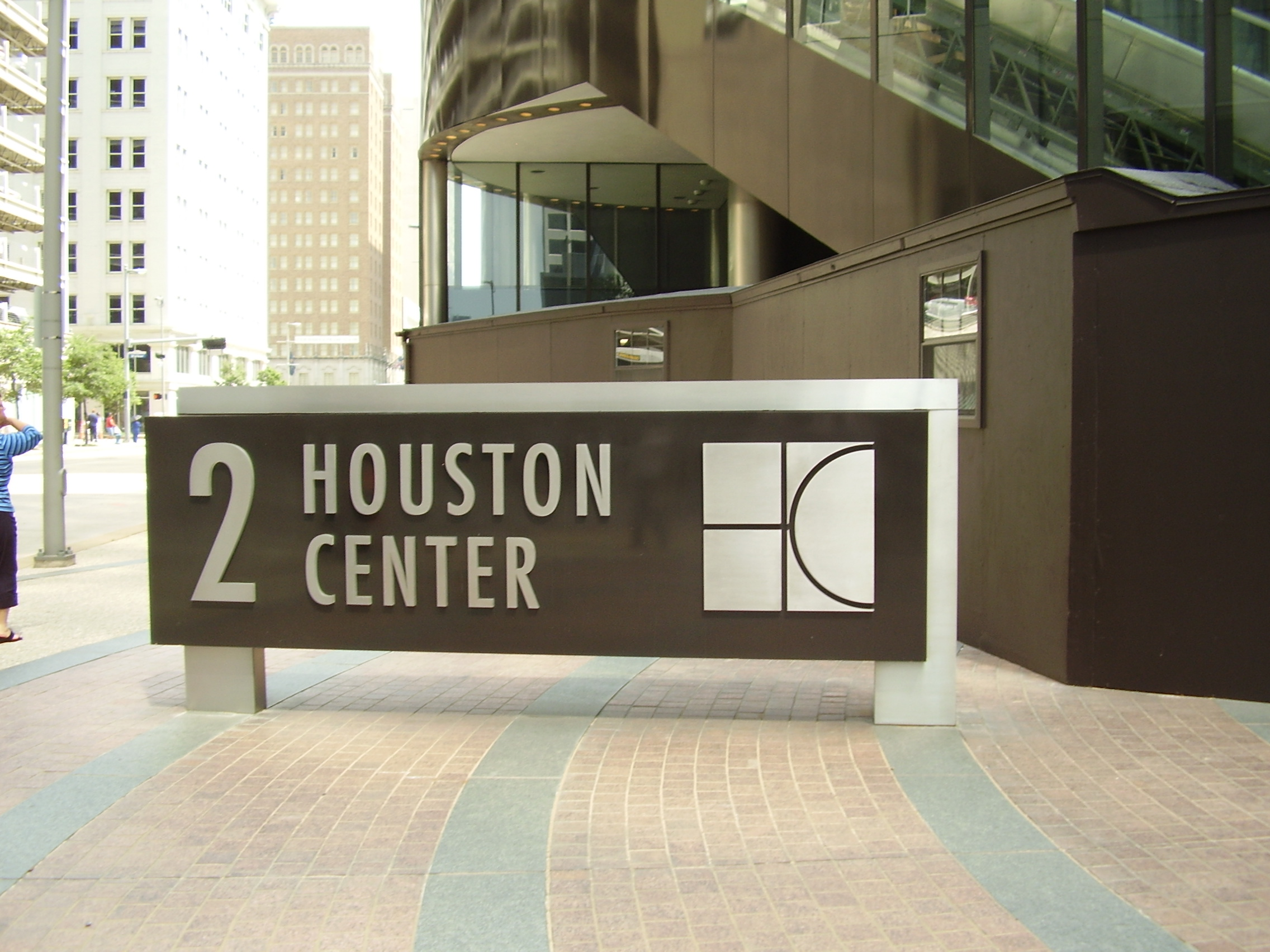
- 2 Houston Center

General information
- Type: Office
- Location: 909 Fannin Street, Houston, Texas
- Coordinates: 29.7564°N 95.3632°W
- Completed: 1974

Height
- Roof: 579 ft (176 m)

Technical details
- Floor count: 40
- Floor area: 1,024,950 sq ft (95,221 m^{2})
- Lifts/elevators: 29, including 6 shuttle and 2 freight

Design and construction
- Architect: Pierce Goodwin Flanagan

Opened in 1974, this building has 40 floors with Class A office space. It is the 19th tallest building in the city. It was planned to be the center of a master-planned "city within a city" that would have included a tram system that would have tied in with Interstate 69/U.S. Highway 59 and run into the tower itself, and a four-story 40,000 car parking garage. It currently has six levels of parking for 495 cars. Several levels of this building extend across Fannin Street and connect to 1 Houston Center. They include a x bracing where the tramway would have been and a patio. It sits on top of Houston's six-mile (10 km) tunnel system.

In 1999 former Mayor of Houston Bob Lanier moved the office of his real estate company to 2 Houston Center. Landar Corporation, Lanier's company, leased 9,700 square feet (900 m^{2}) in 2 Houston Center. In July 2007, a fire was set in the northeast corner of the 16th floor of the building. In 2008 Crescent and the nonprofit Environmental Defense Fund worked together for 10 weeks to cost-effectively upgrade 2 Houston Center. As a result, Crescent will install new lighting, mechanical, and office equipment systems that will reduce the building's total electricity usage by 11%. The new systems may save Crescent and the tenants of 2 Houston Center $400,000 combined each year, and carbon dioxide emissions would be reduced by over 1,300 tons per year. Crescent plans to reduce 2 Houston Center's electricity usage by 20% over a 10-year period beginning in 2008. The company anticipates that the reduction will save the company $700,000 per year. In 2009 McJunkin Red Man Corporation expanded its lease in 2 Houston Center to 13,865 square feet (1,288.1 m^{2}) of space.

The United States Postal Service operates a center in 2 Houston Center. In July 2011 the USPS announced that the post office may close.

The Houston Downtown Management District is headquartered in Suite 1650. The Consulate-General of Japan in Houston is located in Suite 3000.

The lobby of 2 Houston Center was used as a filming location for The Swarm back in 1978.

== 4 Houston Center ==
4 Houston Center is a 674,246 square feet (62,639.5 m^{2}) office building. In 2001 the building was 97% leased. The lower levels of 4 Houston Center have the Shops at Houston Center.

In 2001 RWE Trading Americas leased 25,000 square feet (2,300 m^{2}) of space in 4 Houston Center for its United States headquarters. The firm had the option to lease an additional 50,000 square feet (4,600 m^{2}) of space in the following 18 months. Candace Baggett, the president of the real estate firm Calibre Group, said that the building is attractive to firms which need space for energy trading firms since the building has broad floors, each with over 50,000 square feet (4,600 m^{2}) of space. Energy trading companies typically have wide-open trading floors. Many office buildings have half of the amount of space per floor that 5 Houston Center has. Marian Livingston of Calibre said that in 2001 it was difficult for an energy firm to find a large block of vacant space in Downtown Houston because of the tight market. Calibre represented RWE in the lease.

== 5 Houston Center ==
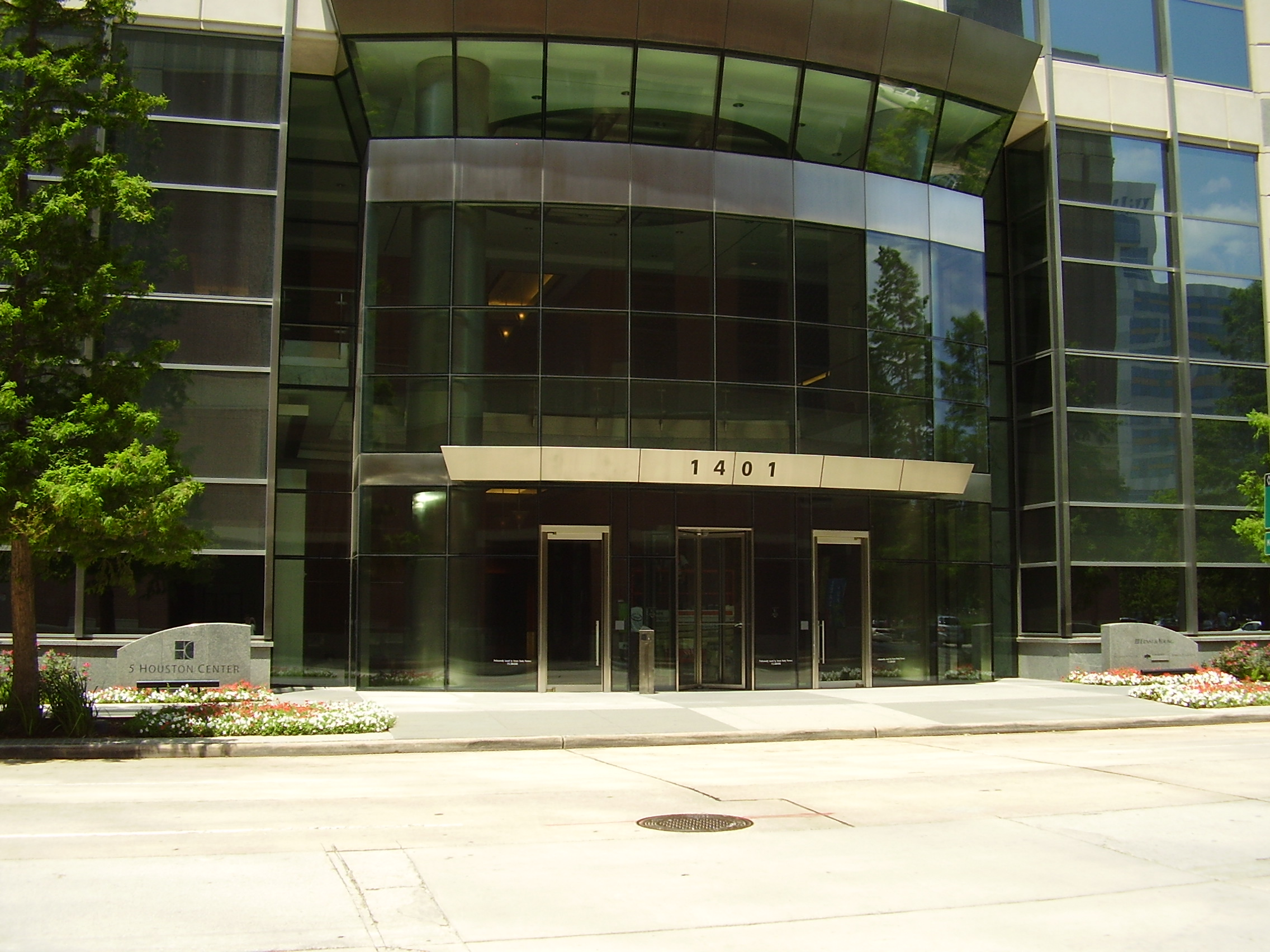
5 Houston Center

5 Houston Center, a 27-story 580,875 square feet (53,965.1 m^{2}) tower, has Class A Office space. Each floor of the tower has 29,000 square feet (2,700 m^{2}) of space. When the building opened, every floor had broadband internet capability. The tower was worth $117 million in 2002. At one time Halliburton had its world headquarters in 5 Houston Center.

In 2000 Ernst & Young signed a 10-year lease for about 127,000 square feet (11,800 m^{2}) of space in the building. Crescent waited for another lease agreement before finalizing plans to build the tower. Construction began in November 2000. The tower, opened ahead of schedule in September 2002, was the first multi-tenant development in Downtown Houston completed since 1986. When it opened it was 88% leased. The building opened with an eight level parking garage inside. The garage, with a ratio of 2.2 cars per 1,000 square feet (93 m^{2}), had the highest car to square foot ratio of any garage in Downtown Houston in 2002. In 2003 5 Houston Center was 92 percent leased. When the tower opened, Ernst & Young U.S. LLP became the largest tenant in the building. Ernst & Young moved its employees and operations to 5 Houston Center from 1 Houston Center.

Halliburton, which signed its lease to occupy a portion of 5 Houston Center in 2002, moved its headquarters there by July 2003. Halliburton occupied 26,000 square feet (2,400 m^{2}) of space on the 24th Floor in 5 Houston Center. The occupancy rate at 5 Houston Center became 80% after Halliburton signed the lease agreement. In addition Jackson Walker, a law firm, moved into 5 Houston Center by 2003. Halliburton planned to move its headquarters to another site in Houston by 2012. By 2009 the Halliburton headquarters had moved.

== Fulbright Tower ==
Fulbright Tower
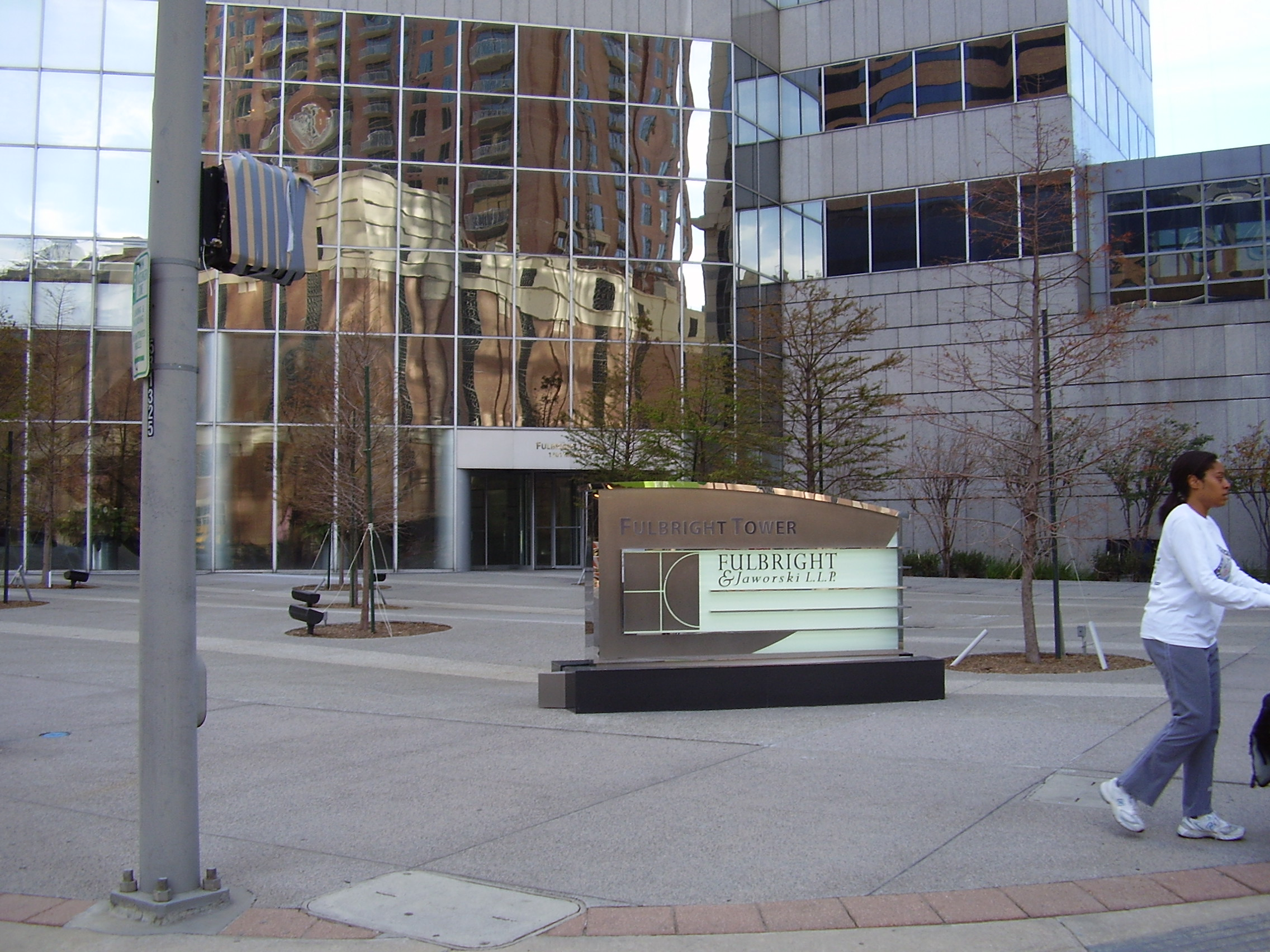

General information
- Location: 1301 McKinney Avenue; Houston, Texas
- Coordinates: 29.75556°N 95.36169°W
- Completed: 1982

Technical details
- Floor count: 52

Design and construction
- Architect: Caudill Rowlett Scott
- Main contractor: W.S. Bellows Construction Corporation

The Fulbright Tower is a 52-story skyscraper originally known as 3 Houston Center. The tower has 1,247,061 square feet (115,855.8 m^{2}) of Class A office space. The building at one point was owned by ChevronTexaco. As of 2005 Crescent owns the tower in a joint venture with the affiliates of GE Asset Management and JPMorgan Asset Management.

Construction on the tower was scheduled to begin in November 1980. The building was built in 1982 by W.S. Bellows Construction Corporation. The tower property was developed in 1985. Fulbright & Jaworski became a tenant during that year. Chevron became the building's main tenant, and its name became the Chevron Tower. Fulbright & Jaworski renegotiated and extended its lease in 2003 and retained the possibility of naming rights; as of 2005 the firm occupies 350,000 square feet (33,000 m^{2}) of space. On February 24, 2005, Crescent completed the joint venture agreement involving the Fulbright Tower; a pension fund investor advised by JPMorgan Asset Management bought a 60% ownership interest in the building and an affiliate of GE Asset Management bought a 16.15% ownership interest. In 2004 ChevronTexaco sold the building to Crescent. During that year the tower was 49% occupied. By March 2005 ChevronTexaco planned to move its operations out of the tower after buying 1500 Louisiana Street in Downtown Houston. Fulbright & Jaworski used their naming rights, and in 2005 the building gained the name Fulbright Tower. In 2005 the Fulbright Tower was 57% occupied. In 2006 Chevron Corporation still occupied three floors at the Fulbright Tower. In 2009 Conway MacKenzie leased 4,619 square feet (429.1 m^{2}) at the Fulbright Tower.

== Proposed additions ==
Crescent proposed the building of 6 Houston Center in the 2000s. As of 2009 the plans did not materialize.

== The Highlight at Houston Center ==
The Highlight at Houston Center
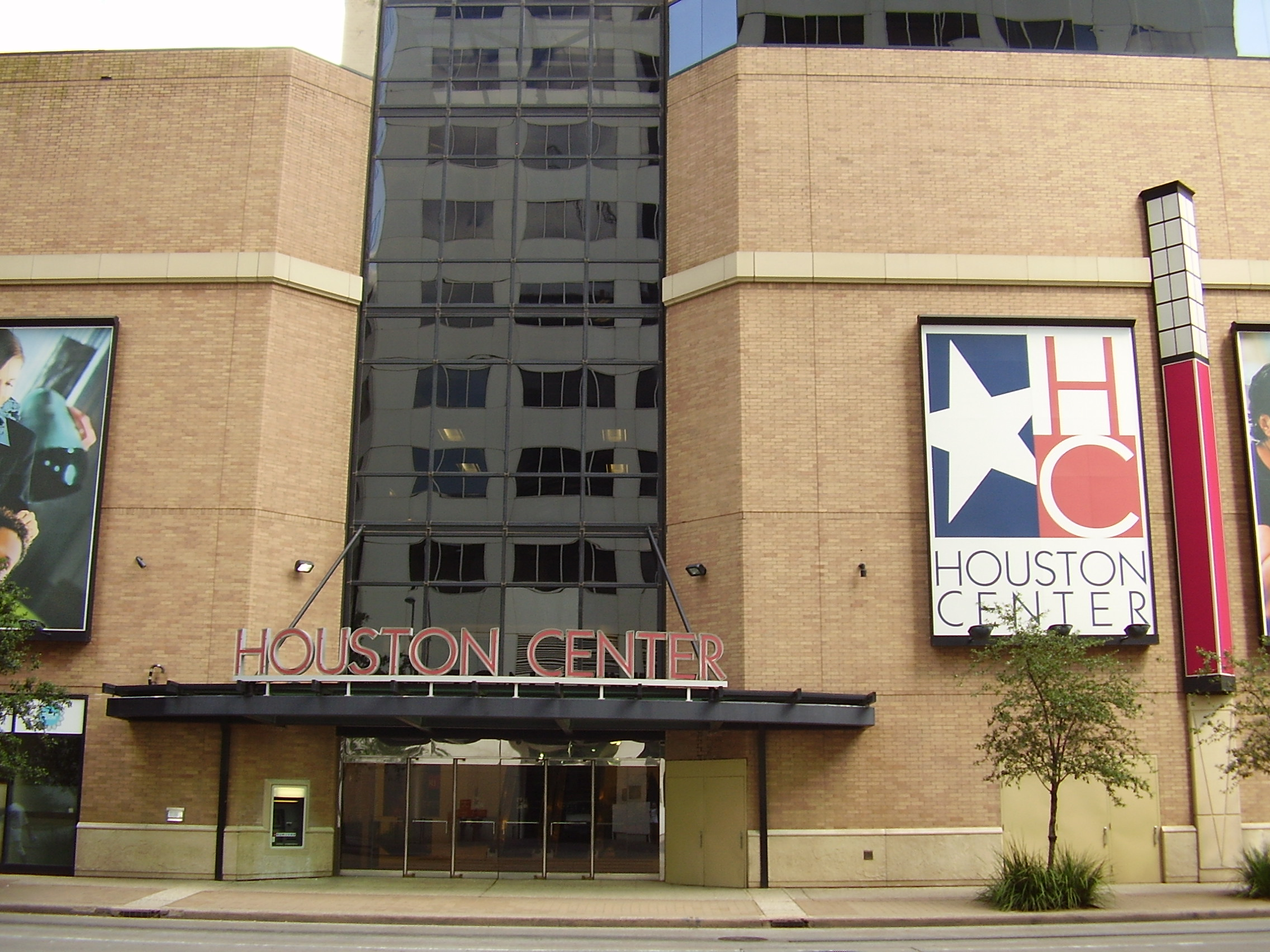
- Main Entrance
- Location: 4 Houston Center
- Coordinates: 29.754913°N 95.362615°W
- Address: 1200 McKinney Street
- Opened: 1982 (44 years ago)
- Floor area: 196,000 sq ft (18,200 m^{2})
- Floors: 3
- Parking: 2 garages
- Public transit: METRO Routes 11, 40, 41, 51, 52, 137, 202, 212, 228, 255, 262, 412
- Website: www.shopsathc.com

The Shops at Houston Center was renamed The Highlight at Houston Center in 2021.

As of 2010 4 Houston Center's Shops at Houston Center has over 35 specialty retailers and 30 restaurants; as of the same year 14,000 people per day shop at the Shops at Houston Center. The Houston Chronicle said that the shops are "a haven for the lunch-hour shopping fix." In 2003 a major renovation by Development Design Group of Baltimore was enacted.

Retail operations at The Shops at Houston Center include:

- 1 Houston Center: 1221 McKinney Street
  - P3 Level: Kelsey-Seybold Clinic (Suite 300)
  - ChevronTexaco Credit Union (Suite 469)
- 2 Houston Center: 909 Fannin Street
  - Bank of America (Suite 2)
- 4 Houston Center: 1200 McKinney Street
  - Jos. A. Bank (Suite 105)
  - T-Mobile (Suite 305)
  - Subway (Suite 343)
  - Chick-fil-A (Suite 363)
  - Great American Cookies (Suite 369)
  - Starbucks (Suites 373 and 496)
  - Dressbarn (Suite 395)
  - Quiznos (Suite 402)
  - General Nutrition Centers (Suite 421)
  - Starship Hallmark Cards (Suite 429)
  - Chase (Suite 433)
  - Potbelly Sandwich Works

In 2010 Kelsey-Seybold Clinic stated that it would move from its original location at 1 Houston Center to the Shops at Houston Center at 4 Houston Center. Kelsey-Seybold will take 23,000 square feet (2,100 m^{2}) of space and will house an imaging center, a clinical laboratory, a pharmacy, and primary care and specialty physicians. The construction of the center was scheduled to begin in July 2010, and completion was scheduled to occur in December 2010. The Kelsey Seybold in 1 Houston Center has 12,700 square feet (1,180 m^{2}). Nicholas Ro, Kelsey-Seybold's vice president of strategic and legal affairs, said that if a customer walked into the lobby of 1 Houston Center, he or she would be unable to see the original clinic. Ro said that the clinic will move to gain a more visible location. The current Kelsey Seybold pharmacy opened on Monday January 17, 2011.

Waldenbooks, formerly in Suite 399 in the Shops at Houston Center, was scheduled for closure. Continental Airlines had a ticketing office at the Park Shops until 2004, when it announced that the office would close. At one time American Express Travel had a shop at the Park Shops.

In 1995 the complex held the "Park Shops Holiday Trolley Tour" which traveled to several sites in Downtown with no admission cost.

== Gallery ==
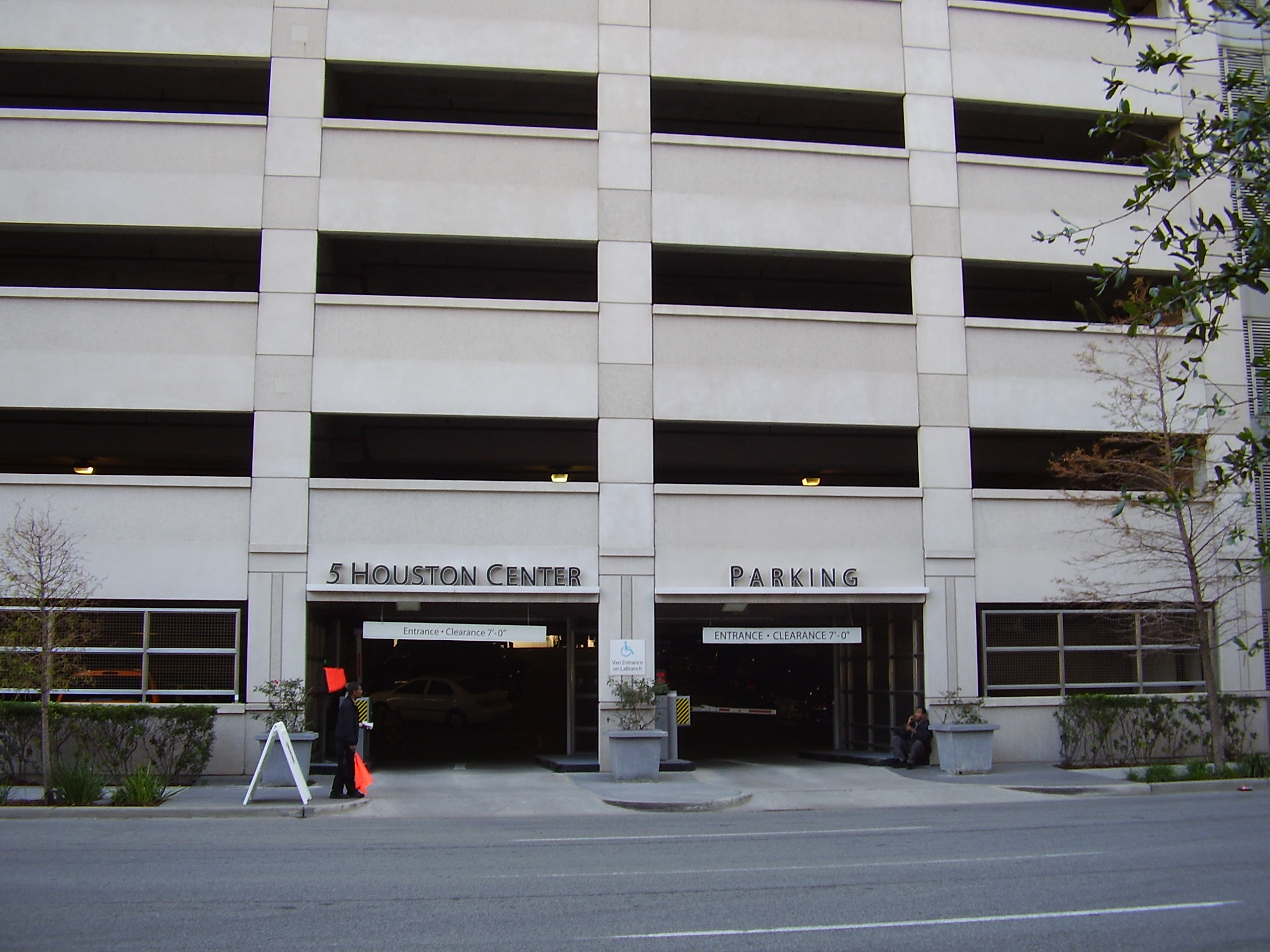
5 Houston Center parking

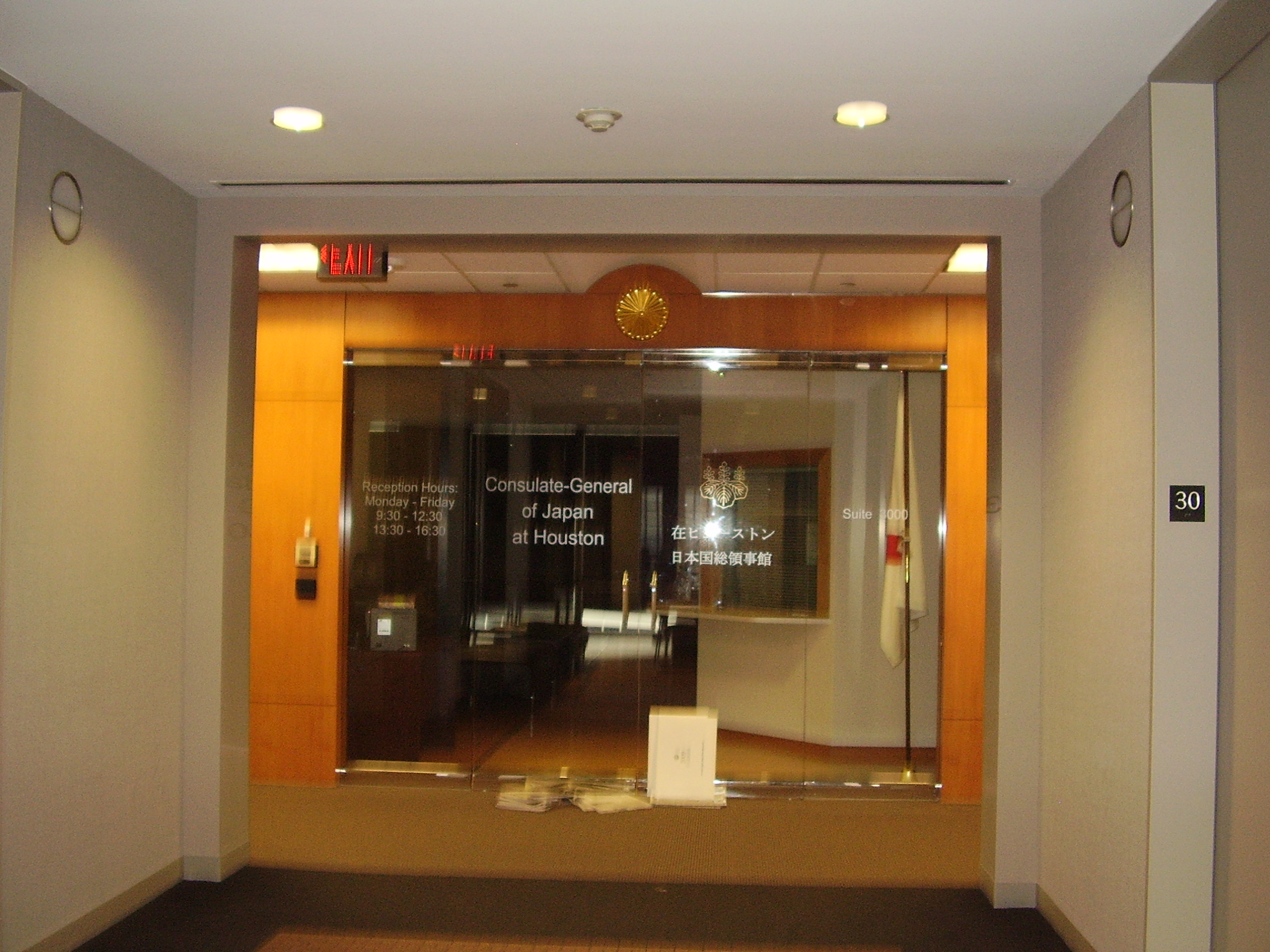
Consulate-General of Japan in Houston in Suite 3000 in 2 Houston Center

== See also ==
- List of tallest buildings in Houston
- List of tallest buildings in Texas
