= Rental vacancy rate =

Economic indicator

The rental vacancy rate is an economic indicator which measures the percentage of rental homes or commercial spaces that are vacant.

== Residential vacancies ==
In the United States the Census Bureau keeps track of vacancy rates. In Canada Canada Mortgage and Housing Corporation measures vacancy rates of 25 metropolitan areas and for the 75 largest Metropolitan Statistical Areas (MSAs) across the country and publishes the findings semi-annually in June and December.

== Commercial vacancies ==
Commercial property vacancy rates can ebb and flow with the shifting economy in various cities, states, and nations. In the United States, for example, according to the Seattle Times office space was "tight" in Seattle and Bellevue in 2013. However, in 2023, the office vacancy rate in the United States had risen to 12.9%, which was seen as the highest ever since one data collection firm began tracking such statistics in the year 2000.
