= Fulbright & Jaworski =

Former American law firm

- Headquarters: Fulbright Tower, Houston, Texas
- No. of offices: 17
- No. of attorneys: 850 (2012)
- Major practice areas: General practice
- Key people: Kenneth Stewart, Chair, Executive Committee
- Date founded: 1919
- Founder: Rufus Fulbright
- Company type: Limited liability partnership
- Dissolved: May 31, 2013, merged with Norton Rose to form Norton Rose Fulbright
- Website: www.fulbright.com

Fulbright & Jaworski was a legal firm in Houston, Texas. The firm was founded in 1919 and dissolved in 2013 after merging with Norton Rose to form Norton Rose Fulbright.

== History ==
The firm was founded in Houston, Texas, by Rufus Fulbright and John Crooker in 1919.

Fulbright & Jaworski represented clients in the energy, financial, and healthcare industries. As trustees of the M.D. Anderson Foundation, Fulbright & Jaworski partners were instrumental in the establishment of the Texas Medical Center, the largest medical system in the world. During its first 50 years, the firm's transportation work included representing the Port of Houston and industries along the Houston Ship Channel.

The late Leon Jaworski, a partner in the firm, headed the investigations into Nazi war crimes during World War II, resulting in the Nuremberg trials. He also served as Assistant to the Attorney General of the United States in the 1963 civil rights case involving James Meredith’s admission to the University of Mississippi. He was later appointed and served as the Watergate Special Prosecutor, 1973–74.

On June 1, 2013, the firm merged with Norton Rose to form Norton Rose Fulbright.

== Notable attorneys ==
- Richard Beckler
- Alfred H. Bennett
- Carolyn Dineen King
- Sim Lake
- Gray H. Miller
- Stephen Susman (1941–2020)
