= Stephen Susman =

American lawyer (1941–2020)

- Born: Stephen Daily Susman; January 20, 1941; Houston, Texas, US
- Died: July 14, 2020 (aged 79); Houston, Texas, US
- Education: Yale University (BA); University of Texas at Austin (JD)
- Years active: 1965–2020
- Employer: Susman Godfrey LLP
- Known for: Won some of the largest cases in U.S. history, including a $1.1 billion settlement on behalf of Texas Instruments; and a $536 million jury verdict in El Paso Natural Gas Co. v. GHR Energy Corp.
- Spouses: Karen Hyman Susman (1965–1997; her death); 2 children; Ellen Spencer Susman (m. 1999)
- Children: Two

Stephen Daily Susman (January 20, 1941 – July 14, 2020) was an American commercial plaintiffs attorney, and founding and name partner of Susman Godfrey LLP. He won more than $2 billion in damages and settlements in just three cases, including a $1.1 billion settlement on behalf of Texas Instruments in Samsung Electronics v. Texas Instruments, and a $536 million jury verdict in El Paso Natural Gas Co. v. GHR Energy Corp.

In 2020, Susman was seriously injured in a biking accident, which left him in a coma for more than a week. While rehabilitating from the injury, he contracted COVID-19 and died.

== Early and personal life ==
Susman was born in Houston, Texas, and grew up in the Riverside neighborhood in the city, at a time when Jewish families such as his were barred by deed restrictions from living in River Oaks, the city's most expensive neighborhood. His father, Harry, was a graduate of Yale Law School where he was Editor of the Yale Law Journal, and practiced law in Houston until his death of a bleeding ulcer at the age of 50.

His mother, Helene Daily Susman, was a 1934 graduate of the University of Texas School of Law, and returned to her law practice and raised Susman and his brother after the death of their father when Susman was eight years old and his brother Tommy was six years old. His mother became the first woman from Texas admitted to the bar of the Supreme Court of the United States. Susman said: "My mother and father were both lawyers, so I never even thought about doing anything else."

He and his brother also attended the University of Texas School of Law, at the insistence of their mother. In addition, his son Harry attended the University of Texas School of Law. He was editor-in-chief of the Texas Law Review and clerked for a Supreme Court Justice.

His first wife, Karen Hyman Susman, from Austin, Texas, married Susman in 1965. She died in 1997 at age 55. Susman and Karen had two children; Stacy and Harry. He married Ellen Spencer Susman, at the time a television personality, in 1999. They had homes in Aspen, Colorado, Houston, Napa, and New York City.

== Education ==
Susman attended Yale University, where he earned a B.A. magna cum laude in English in 1962. While at Yale, to make ends meet he waited tables in the school's dining hall, acted as a travel agent for his classmates, ran a student laundry, and leased out caps and gowns to his graduating classmates.

Susman earned his J.D. at the University of Texas School of Law with highest honors in 1965. While attending law school, Susman was editor-in-chief of the Texas Law Review, graduated first in his class with the highest grade point average in the school's history, was a member of the Order of the Coif, and was Grand Chancellor. He then clerked for the Honorable John R. Brown of the Fifth Circuit Court of Appeals, and for Justice Hugo Black at the Supreme Court of the United States.

== Legal career ==
Returning to Texas, Susman joined the law firm of Fulbright & Jaworski (now Norton Rose Fulbright), becoming one of its first Jewish partners. For the first eight years of his career he was a defense lawyer, before becoming a plaintiffs' lawyer. After taking a leave of absence and teaching antitrust law at the University of Texas Law School, and considering becoming a full-time law professor (a notion nixed by his then-wife), in 1976 he joined a small plaintiffs maritime firm, Mandell & Wright of Houston, that had a contingency practice, to start a new commercial litigation practice there.

=== Susman Godfrey ===
Susman founded Susman Godfrey LLP in 1980. The firm specializes in representing plaintiffs in antitrust and securities class actions on a contingent fee basis. In January 2005 the firm was named one of the top two litigation boutiques in the country by The American Lawyer. It has been cited as the nation's top litigation boutique law firm in the Vault Rankings every year since 2012, and in 2020 was ranked by Vault as well as the nation's top midsize firm to work for, for career outlook, compensation, satisfaction, and selectivity (most of its attorneys were members of their schools’ law reviews, and nearly all clerked for federal judges, including 11 for U.S. Supreme Court justices). In 2006 he opened a New York City office for the firm.

He won some of the largest cases in U.S. history, including a $1.1 billion ($2,300,000,000 in current dollar terms) settlement on behalf of Texas Instruments in the breach of contract case of Samsung Electronics v. Texas Instruments in 1996; and a $536 million ($1,500,000,000 in current dollar terms) jury verdict on counterclaim in El Paso Natural Gas Co. v. GHR Energy Corp in 1988. Susman won a verdict for the plaintiffs in the Corrugated Container Antitrust case in 1979, at $550 million ($2,400,000,000 in current dollar terms) the largest verdict in antitrust history at the time, and the case ultimately settled for $500 million (A lawyer who joined the firm in 1990 was given an office tour by Susman. A large, irregularly cut piece of cardboard was stuck to the wall in Susman's office, and the new hire asked if it was a memento from Susman's famous Corrugated Container case. Susman's quick explanation: “No, f—face, it’s a Rauschenberg.”). He won a $140 million California jury verdict for the plaintiff in the antitrust case Masimo v. Tyco Health Care Group.

In 2010, Susman was among a team of attorneys that represented Los Angeles Dodgers owner Frank McCourt in his divorce trial.

Susman split his time between his firm's Houston and New York offices.

Susman Godfrey represented Dominion Voting Systems in defamation litigation against parties including My Pillow Guy, Fox News, Newsmax, Rudy Giuliani, and Sydney Powell, over claims that the company's voting machines had fraudulently tabulated votes in the 2020 presidential election. The FoxNews lawsuit resulted in a $787.5 million settlement. The other lawsuits are pending.

== Professional recognition ==
In 1994, Susman was one of 14 lawyers featured in America's Top Trial Lawyers: Who They Are & Why They Win, by Don Vinson. He was named the top litigator in 1996 in a worldwide poll of attorneys. In 2006, the National Law Journal featured him as one of the top ten litigators in the United States.

In 2015, the 50th anniversary of Susman's election as editor-in-chief of the Texas Law Review, the Texas Law Review Association established a scholarship in his name.

In 2016, Susman was one of six lawyers recognized by the American Lawyer for his lifetime achievements as a trial lawyer. As of 2019, The Best Lawyers in America had listed him in each of its 20 years of publication. Who's Who Legal: The International Who's Who of Business Lawyers twice named him the Leading Commercial Litigator in the World. Susman was consistently among Super Lawyers’ top 10 most-voted-for attorneys. In 2019, the legal media company Lawdragon inducted him into its Hall of Fame.

== Related work ==
Susman developed trial agreements with the purpose of reducing litigation costs for both sides and bringing cases to trial more efficiently. As a result of Susman's belief in a contingency-fee model and the law firm efficiency necessary to make it work, in 2012 he launched "Trial by Agreement" as a repository of pre-trial and trial agreements that lawyers can use to reduce the expense of unwarranted discovery and associated motions.

Among his professional affiliations (2013–16) were State Bar of Texas (chairman, Section on Antitrust and Trade Regulation, 1976–77); the American Board of Trial Advocates (co-Chair of its Jury Trial Committee); American Bar Association, member of the commission on the Impact of the Economic Crisis on the Profession and Legal Needs (Section of Antitrust Law); Director of Texas Association of Civil Trial and Appellate Specialists; University of Texas MD Anderson Cancer Center Board of Visitors; and Charter Member of the Institute for Responsible Dispute Resolution.

Susman founded and was executive director of the Civil Jury Project, dedicated to studying civil jury trials and trying to stem their decline, at the New York University School of Law. He was an adjunct professor there, occasionally teaching the course, "How to Try a Jury Case Intelligently."

== Charitable giving ==
In May 2010, the University of Texas announced a $5 million gift from alumnus Susman in support of the university's law school. In recognition of this gift, the board of regents, the governing body for The University of Texas System, established the Stephen D. Susman Academic Center, which opened in August of the same year, and which Dean Lawrence G. Sager described the center as "the heart of the UT Law Enterprise."

In December 2011, Yale University announced an $11 million gift from alumnus Susman in support of new exhibition space at the Yale University Art Gallery. The newly renovated art gallery re-opened on December 12, 2012.

Along with his wife Ellen, Stephen Susman sat on the boards of many arts organizations, including the 2015-2016 National Leadership Board of the Blanton Museum of Art in Austin, Texas. Through the Susman Family Foundation, the couple has made financial gifts to The Aspen Institute, and other programs and non-profit organizations related to the arts, justice, and the environment. He endowed the Karen & Stephen Susman Hall, Slifka Center for Jewish Life at Yale University, the Harry Susman Summer Scholarship in Israel Scholarship at Yale, and founded the Helen D. Susman Woman of Prominence Award at the American Jewish Community.

== Death ==
On April 22, 2020, Susman sustained serious head injuries in a bicycling accident in Houston's Old Braeswood neighborhood, and was admitted to Memorial Hermann–Texas Medical Center in Houston. He was in a coma for more than a week, and continued to be in a critical condition. After Susman came out of the coma, was moved to TIRR Memorial Hermann rehabilitation hospital, and was making progress in his rehabilitation, he contracted COVID-19 on June 24, during the COVID-19 pandemic in Texas. He died on July 14, 2020.

Dick Sayles of Bradley Arant Boult Cummings, who faced him at trial, said: "I've known a lot of lawyers and I've been around a long time, and Steve is a legend and he deserves to be known as a legend. He was a terrific lawyer, he was the most formidable adversary, and he was a terrific friend." Tom Melsheimer of Winston & Strawn described Susman as "almost indisputably the smartest trial lawyer who ever lived," and a "Shakespeare when it came to the use of the F-word."

== See also ==
- List of law clerks for the first seat of the Supreme Court of the United States
