= Gene Chilton =

American football player (born 1964)

No. 58, 74, 62, 63
- Positions: Center, tackle

Personal information
- Born: March 27, 1964 (age 62); Houston, Texas, U.S.
- Listed height: 6 ft 3 in (1.91 m)
- Listed weight: 281 lb (127 kg)

Career information
- High school: Memorial (Hedwig Village, Texas)
- College: Texas
- NFL draft: 1986: 3rd round, 59th overall pick

Career history
- St. Louis Cardinals (1986–1987); Phoenix Cardinals* (1988); Kansas City Chiefs (1989); New England Patriots (1990–1992)
- * Offseason or practice squad member only

Awards and highlights
- First-team All-American (1985); All-Southwest Conference - 1985; Southwest Conference Champion - 1983

Career NFL statistics
- Games played: 79
- Games started: 42
- Fumble recoveries: 3
- Stats at Pro Football Reference

Gene Alan Chilton (born March 27, 1964) is an American former professional football player who was a center in the National Football League (NFL).

== Early life ==
Chilton was born and raised in Houston, Texas, and played scholastically at Memorial High School where he helped the team reach the 1979 Texas 4A State Football Championship game.

== College career ==
Chilton played college football at Texas from 1982–85, where he was a first-team All-American and team captain in 1985.

In his freshman year, Chilton helped the Longhorns to a 9-3 record and a trip to the 1982 Sun Bowl.

In his sophomore year, Chilton earned 2nd Team All-Southwest Conference honors as the Longhorns won the Southwest Conference and came up one point short in the Cotton Bowl of a perfect season and a National Championship.

In his junior year Chilton was a 2nd Team Newspaper Enterprise All-American as the Longhorns went 7-4-1 and earned a trip to the 1984 Freedom Bowl.

In his senior year Chilton helped the Longhorns to an 8-4 record and a trip to the 1985 Bluebonnet Bowl. In addition to being 1st team Walter Camp and Newspaper Enterprise Association All-American, he was 2nd Team UPI and 3rd Team AP All-American. He was all named to the All-Southwest Conference Team.

When his college career was over, Chilton played in the 1986 Senior Bowl.

== Pro career ==
=== St. Louis/Phoenix Cardinals ===
Chilton was selected by the St. Louis Cardinals in the third round of the 1986 NFL draft with the 59th overall pick. He spent two seasons with the Cardinals, during which time he played in 27 games and started 7. During his second season they moved him from center to tackle where he was a reserve. At the end of camp in 1988, he was waived by the Cardinals and did not play in the 1988 season.

=== Kansas City Chiefs ===
In March 1989, Chilton was signed by the Kansas City Chiefs who moved him back to center. He played in every game that season as a reserve, despite a persistent injury to his foot, as the Chiefs went 8-7-1 and barely missed the playoffs.

At the end of the 1990 training camp, the Chiefs placed him on procedural waivers, deciding to go with Tim Grunhard as center instead. The next day he was claimed by the New England Patriots and placed on their final roster.

=== New England Patriots ===
With the Patriots in 1990, he went from cut by the Chiefs to starting center in week 3, but his season was cut short after a season-ending knee injury in week 5.

After a demanding rehabilitation process he was re-signed by the Patriots the day before veterans were due at camp. The 1991 season was Chilton's first as the starter in all 16 games despite recovering slowly from knee surgery and suffering a dislocated finger that required mid-season surgery. That injury had bone and tendon sticking out of his hand, but he finished the game anyway. He helped the Patriots improve from last place in the NFL to a respectable 6-10. At the end of the season he became a free agent.

Chilton was again an all-season starter in 1992, his final season, despite an injury to his elbow. It was a disappointing season that found the Patriots once again finish in last place in the NFL - tied with the Seahawks.

Going into the 1993, Chilton indicated he planned to retire and he did not return to camp in the summer - in part because new Head Coach Bill Parcells thought he was too slow.
