= Westchester High School =

Westchester High School can refer to:

- Westchester High School (Los Angeles)
- Westchester Academy for International Studies, formerly Westchester High School (Houston)
