= Piney Point Village, Texas =

City of Piney Point Village
- City
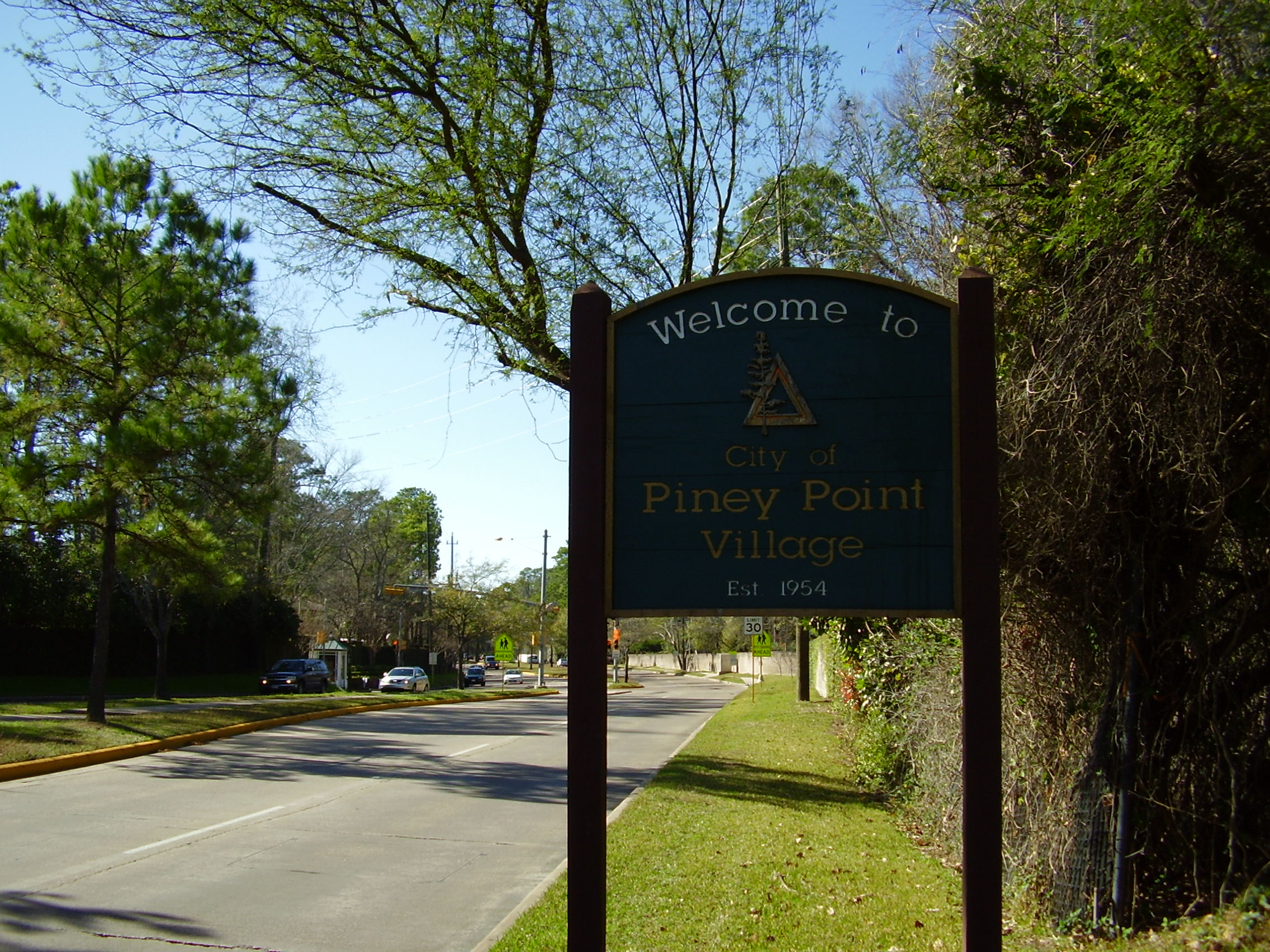
- A sign indicating the city limits

- Location in Harris County and the state of Texas
- Coordinates: 29°45′42″N 95°30′58″W
- Country: United States
- State: Texas
- County: Harris

Government
  - Type: City Council
  - Mayor: Jonathan C. Curth

Area
  - Total: 2.13 sq mi (5.52 km^{2})
  - Land: 2.13 sq mi (5.52 km^{2})
  - Water: 0.0039 sq mi (0.01 km^{2})
- Elevation: 72 ft (22 m)

Population (2020)
  - Total: 3,128
  - Density: 1,470/sq mi (567/km^{2})
- Time zone: UTC-6 (Central (CST))
  - Summer (DST): UTC-5 (CDT)
- Postal codes: 77024 & 77063
- FIPS code: 48-57800
- GNIS feature ID: 1375473
- Website: City of Piney Point Village

Piney Point Village is a city in Harris County, Texas, United States. The population was 3,128 at the 2020 census. Piney Point Village is the wealthiest place in Texas, as ranked by per capita income. It is part of a collection of upscale residential communities in west Houston known as the Memorial Villages.

== History ==
In 1885, Piney Point Village began as a station on the Texas Western Railroad. German farmers settled in the area. According to 1936 state highway maps, the community was near a sawmill.

In the mid 1950s, an effort to form a Spring Branch municipality failed. Piney Point Village incorporated in 1955 with an alderman form of government. Because of the 1955 incorporation, Houston did not incorporate Piney Point Village's territory into its city limits, while Houston annexed surrounding areas that were unincorporated. In 1960 the city had 1,790 residents. By 1966 the city had one public school and four churches. In 1990 the city had 3,380 residents.

For a decade ending in 1993 the Consulate-General of Japan in Houston refused to pay "user fees" billed to the consulate by the City of Piney Point Village (the consul-general residence is in Piney Point Village). The Japanese argued that this was a tax and that diplomatic facilities should not be taxed. In 1993 Piney Point Village announced that the consulate owed the city around $14,000 United States dollars. The Japanese argued that international agreements exempted consulate facilities from taxes, while Piney Point Village said the annual fees were for user services. James Baker, a Piney Point Village alderman, threatened to suspend garbage pickup services and expose the Japanese consulate to ridicule. In September of that year a U.S. State Department letter stated that consulates should pay legitimate user fees, and that consulates do not have to pay for fire and police services. The consulate paid almost $12,000, including $4,500 in interest, to the city. According to Vice-Consul Takaki Takinami originally the city charged $14,915.52 before changing the invoice and deducting police and fire costs. Shojiro Imanishi, who was the outgoing consul-general, agreed to pay $4,500 annually. In 1993 the Consulate-General of Indonesia in Houston and the Consulate-General of Australia in Houston had consul-general residences in Piney Point Village; they paid the fees voluntarily and without controversy.

== Geography ==
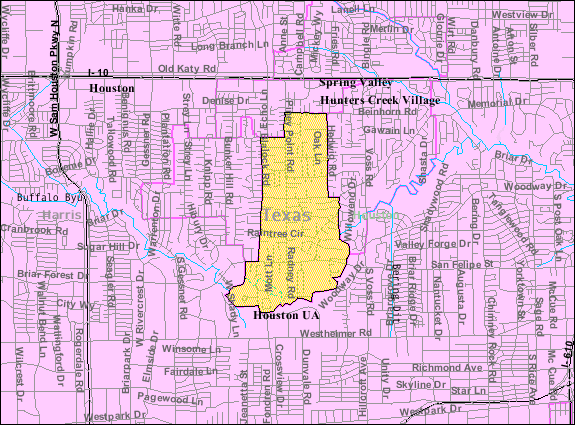
Map of Piney Point Village

Piney Point Village is located at 29°45′42″N 95°30′58″W (29.761728, –95.516029).

According to the United States Census Bureau, the city has a total area of 2.1 square miles (5.4 km^{2}), all land.

== Demographics ==
Historical population
Census	Pop.	Note	%±
1960	1,790		—
1970	2,548		42.3%
1980	2,958		16.1%
1990	3,197		8.1%
2000	3,380		5.7%
2010	3,125		−7.5%
2020	3,128		0.1%
U.S. Decennial Census; 2020 Census

=== Racial and ethnic composition ===
Piney Point Village city, Texas – Racial and ethnic composition Note: the US Census treats Hispanic/Latino as an ethnic category. This table excludes Latinos from the racial categories and assigns them to a separate category. Hispanics/Latinos may be of any race.
Race / Ethnicity (NH = Non-Hispanic)	Pop 2000	Pop 2010	Pop 2020	% 2000	% 2010	% 2020
White alone (NH)	2,907	2,540	2,263	86.01%	81.28%	72.35%
Black or African American alone (NH)	18	46	30	0.53%	1.47%	0.96%
Native American or Alaska Native alone (NH)	0	2	4	0.00%	0.06%	0.13%
Asian alone (NH)	284	344	417	8.40%	11.01%	13.33%
Native Hawaiian or Pacific Islander alone (NH)	3	1	0	0.09%	0.03%	0.00%
Other race alone (NH)	2	0	18	0.06%	0.00%	0.58%
Mixed race or Multiracial (NH)	39	50	141	1.15%	1.60%	4.51%
Hispanic or Latino (any race)	127	142	255	3.76%	4.54%	8.15%
Total	3,380	3,125	3,128	100.00%	100.00%	100.00%

=== 2020 census ===
As of the 2020 census, Piney Point Village had a population of 3,128. The median age was 50.3 years. 22.1% of residents were under the age of 18 and 25.3% of residents were 65 years of age or older. For every 100 females there were 100.1 males, and for every 100 females age 18 and over there were 98.9 males age 18 and over.

As of the 2020 census, 100.0% of residents lived in urban areas, while 0.0% lived in rural areas.

As of the 2020 census, there were 1,047 households in Piney Point Village, of which 36.0% had children under the age of 18 living in them. Of all households, 80.4% were married-couple households, 7.2% were households with a male householder and no spouse or partner present, and 11.1% were households with a female householder and no spouse or partner present. About 10.6% of all households were made up of individuals and 7.8% had someone living alone who was 65 years of age or older.

As of the 2020 census, there were 1,122 housing units, of which 6.7% were vacant. The homeowner vacancy rate was 2.7% and the rental vacancy rate was 0.0%.

Racial composition as of the 2020 census
Race	Number	Percent
White	2,302	73.6%
Black or African American	31	1.0%
American Indian and Alaska Native	7	0.2%
Asian	418	13.4%
Native Hawaiian and Other Pacific Islander	0	0.0%
Some other race	65	2.1%
Two or more races	305	9.8%
Hispanic or Latino (of any race)	255	8.2%

=== 2010 census ===
According to the 2010 census there were 3,125 people, 1,064 households and 945 families. 377 families had children under 18 in their household. Whites compromise 85.1% of the population, 11.0% are Asian, 4.5% Hispanic, and 1.7% African American.

=== 2000 census ===
As of the census of 2000, there were 3,380 people, 1,225 households, and 982 families residing in the city. The population density was 1,580.3 inhabitants per square mile (610.2/km^{2}). There were 1,282 housing units at an average density of 599.4 per square mile (231.4/km^{2}). The racial makeup of the city was 89.26% White and 8.40% Asian. Additionally, Piney Point is home to a small minority community which is, 0.53% African American, 0.03% Native American, 0.09% Pacific Islander, 0.44% from other races, and 1.24% from two or more races. Hispanic or Latino of any race were 3.76% of the population.

There were 1,225 households, out of which 36.6% had children under the age of 18 living with them, 75.8% were married couples living together, 2.9% had a female householder with no husband present, and 19.8% were non-families. 18.0% of all households were made up of individuals, and 8.3% had someone living alone who was 65 years of age or older. The average household size was 2.76 and the average family size was 3.12.

In the city, the population was spread out, with 26.6% under the age of 18, 4.1% from 18 to 24, 17.0% from 25 to 44, 37.3% from 45 to 64, and 15.0% who were 65 years of age or older. The median age was 46 years. For every 100 females, there were 96.5 males. For every 100 females age 18 and over, there were 90.8 males.

The median income for a household in the city was $184,991, and the median income for a family was $200,000. Males had a median income of $100,000 versus $57,222 for females. The per capita income for the city was $133,247. About 2.4% of families and 3.7% of the population were below the poverty line, including 4.0% of those under age 18 and 3.6% of those age 65 or over.

== Infrastructure and government ==
=== Local government ===
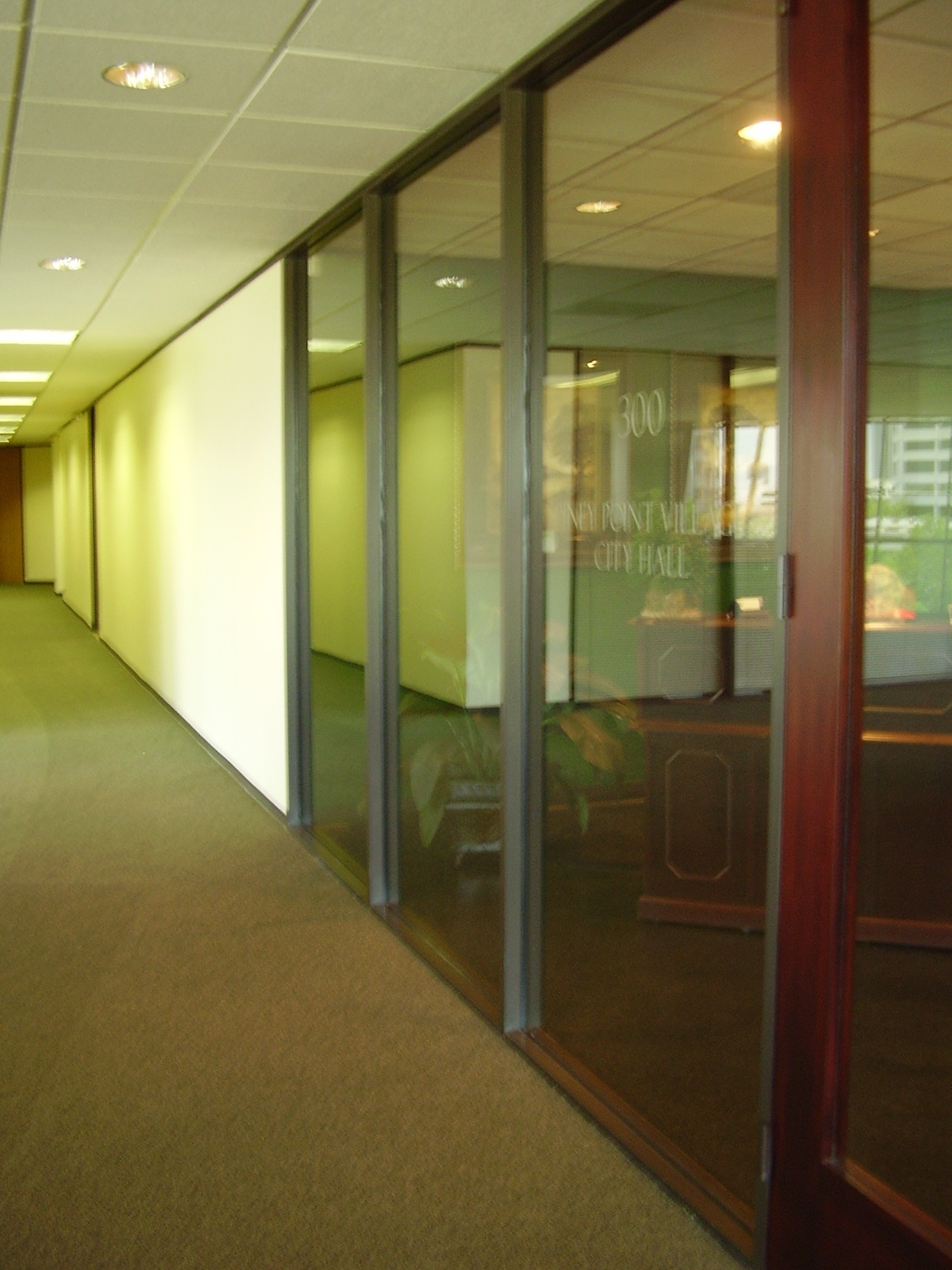
Piney Point Village City Hall was Suite 300 in the 7676 Woodway office complex at 7676 Woodway Drive in Houston. It is now located at Suite 460 in the 7660 Woodway office complex in Houston

The city has restrictions against all forms of business.

At one point city hall was located in Suite 100 at 7721 San Felipe Drive in Piney Point Village. The office suite faced demolition, forcing city hall to move. In May 2008, Piney Point Village residents voiced opposition after the city proceeded to purchase a $1.5 million U.S. dollar, 12-room mansion at 230 Blalock Road to serve as city hall with six staffed employees. The residents believed that the city government's manner of purchasing and the lack of notification of area residents was not ethical. The city government stated that it decided to buy the mansion to avoid high rental costs. The city later backed out of the deal. Effective on July 26, 2007 city hall moved to Suite 300 in the 7676 Woodway office complex at 7676 Woodway Drive in Houston.

Bunker Hill Village, Hunters Creek Village, and Piney Point Village jointly operate the Memorial Villages Police Department. The Village Fire Department serves all of the Memorial villages. The village is within the Memorial Villages Water Authority.

=== County, federal, and state representation ===
Harris County Precinct Three, headed by Steve Radack as of 2008, serves Piney Point Village.

Harris Health System (formerly Harris County Hospital District) designated Northwest Health Center for ZIP code 77024 and Valbona Health Center (formerly People's Health Center) in Greater Sharpstown for 77063. The nearest public hospital is Ben Taub General Hospital in the Texas Medical Center.

Piney Point Village is located in District 136 of the Texas House of Representatives. As of 2008 Beverly Woolley represents the district. Piney Point Village is within District 7 of the Texas Senate; as of 2008 Dan Patrick represents the district.

Piney Point Village is in Texas's 7th congressional district; in 2008, the pro-Republican Party publication Human Events identified the zip code 77024 as the zip code that gave the eighth largest contribution to John McCain's 2008 U.S. Presidential Election campaign. The zip code, which includes the portion of Piney Point Village north of the Buffalo Bayou, gave $540,309 United States dollars by October 24, 2008. As of 2019, however, the 7th congressional district is represented by a Democrat, Lizzie Pannill Fletcher.

== Politics ==
In the 2016 presidential election, Piney Point Village went to Republican nominee Donald Trump with 1,212 votes (68%) while Democratic nominee Hillary Clinton received 499 votes (28%). In the 2020 presidential election, Piney Point Village tallied 1,414 votes (66%) for Republican nominee Trump and 691 votes (32%) for Democratic nominee Joe Biden. In the 2024 presidential election, Republican nominee Trump garnered 1,336 votes (70%) in Piney Point Village to Democratic nominee Kamala Harris's 519 votes (27%).

=== Voting history ===
In recent decades, Piney Point Village has consistently supported Republican presidential and gubernatorial candidates. In the 2020 presidential election, even as Joe Biden made gains on Hillary Clinton's performance in more urbanized areas in the state of Texas, Donald Trump exceeded his 2016 percentage in the city. The largest showing for a Republican presidential candidate in this city since 2000 is the 81.88% won by Mitt Romney in 2012.

The largest showing for a Republican gubernatorial candidate is the 91.15% received by George W. Bush in his 1998 gubernatorial re-election bid.

Piney Point Village city vote by party in presidential elections
Year	Democratic	Republican	Third parties
2020	32.43% 691	66.35% 1,414	1.22% 26
2016	27.22% 499	66.12% 1,212	6.66% 122
2012	16.60% 295	81.88% 1,455	1.52% 27
2008	23.48% 437	75.01% 1,396	1.50% 28
2004	20.85% 385	77.04% 1,419	2.06% 38
2000	15.36% 264	81.68% 1,404	2.97% 51

Piney Point Village city vote by party in gubernatorial elections
Year	Democratic	Republican	Third Parties
2022	28.46% 477	70.29% 1,178	1.25% 21
2018	23.35% 413	75.24% 1,331	1.41% 25
2014	18.77% 231	79.77% 982	1.46% 18
2010	26.23% 369	72.28% 1,017	1.49% 21
2006	15.79% 192	58.63% 713	25.58% 311
2002	17.49% 235	80.80% 1,086	1.71% 23
1998	8.13% 101	91.15% 1,133	0.72% 9

== Education ==
=== Primary and secondary schools ===
==== Public schools ====
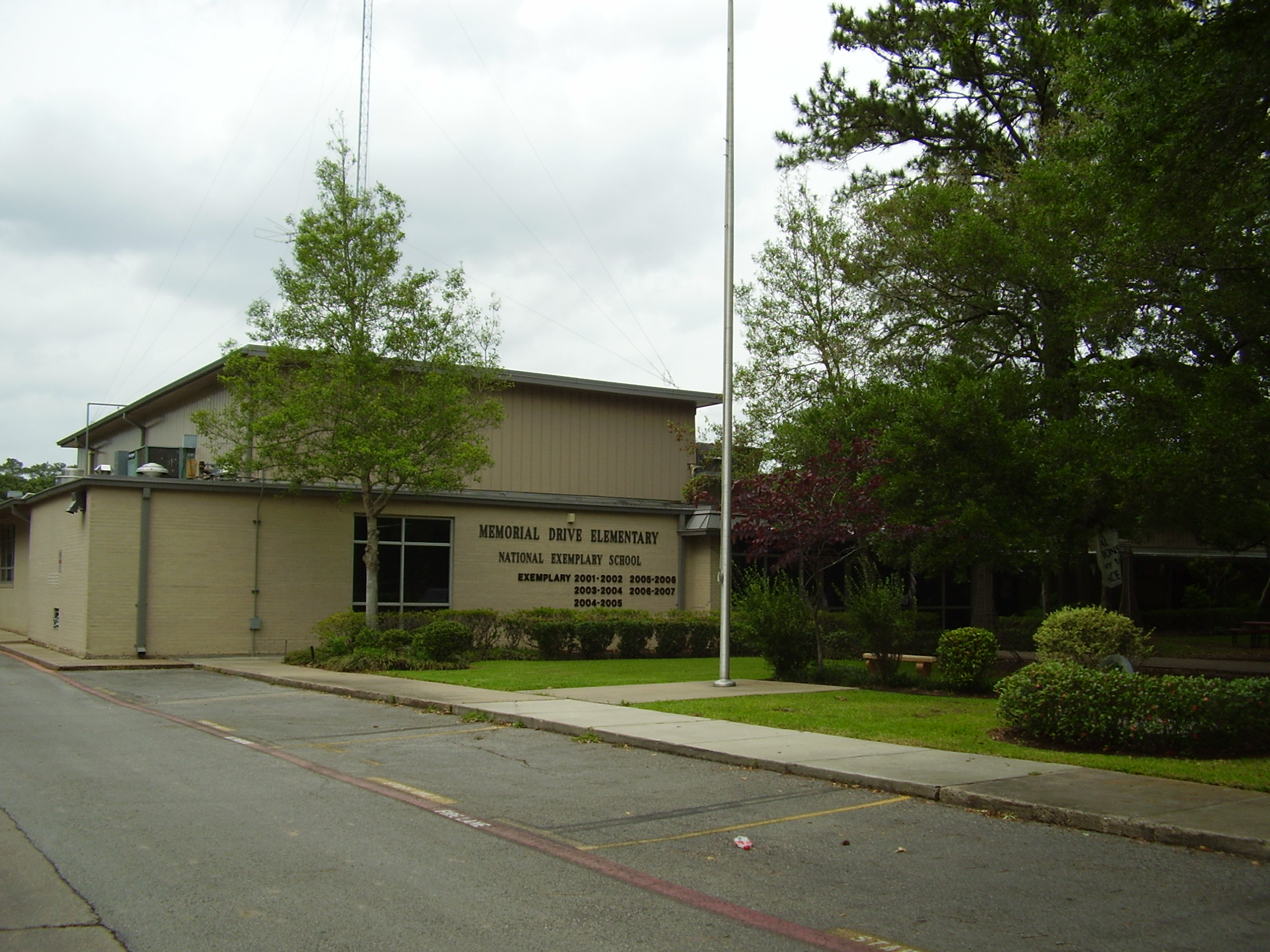
Memorial Drive Elementary School

Almost all of the city is served by the Spring Branch Independent School District while a small portion is served by the Houston Independent School District.

===== Spring Branch Independent School District =====
Most of Piney Point Village is north of the Buffalo Bayou. That portion is served by Spring Branch Independent School District.

All residents are assigned to Wildcat Way School in Houston for preschool.

Memorial Drive Elementary School is within the city boundaries of Piney Point Village and serves all residents in the SBISD portion. Piney Point-resident students in SBISD are zoned to Spring Branch Middle School and Memorial High School, both in Hedwig Village.

===== Houston Independent School District =====
The portion south of the Buffalo Bayou is served by the Houston Independent School District.

HISD students are zoned to Ralph Waldo Emerson Elementary School, Revere Middle School, and Margaret Long Wisdom High School (formerly Robert E. Lee High School) (students may attend Lamar High School or Westside High School instead.) Residents of the Emerson Elementary School attendance zone may apply for the Briarmeadow Charter School. Mark White Elementary School is scheduled to open in August 2016. Residents of the Emerson Elementary zone, along with those of the Briargrove, Pilgrim, and Piney Point zones, will be allowed to apply to this school.

When Westside opened in 2000, residents of the Lee attendance boundary gained the option to attend Westside instead of Lee, with no free transportation provided.

==== Private schools ====
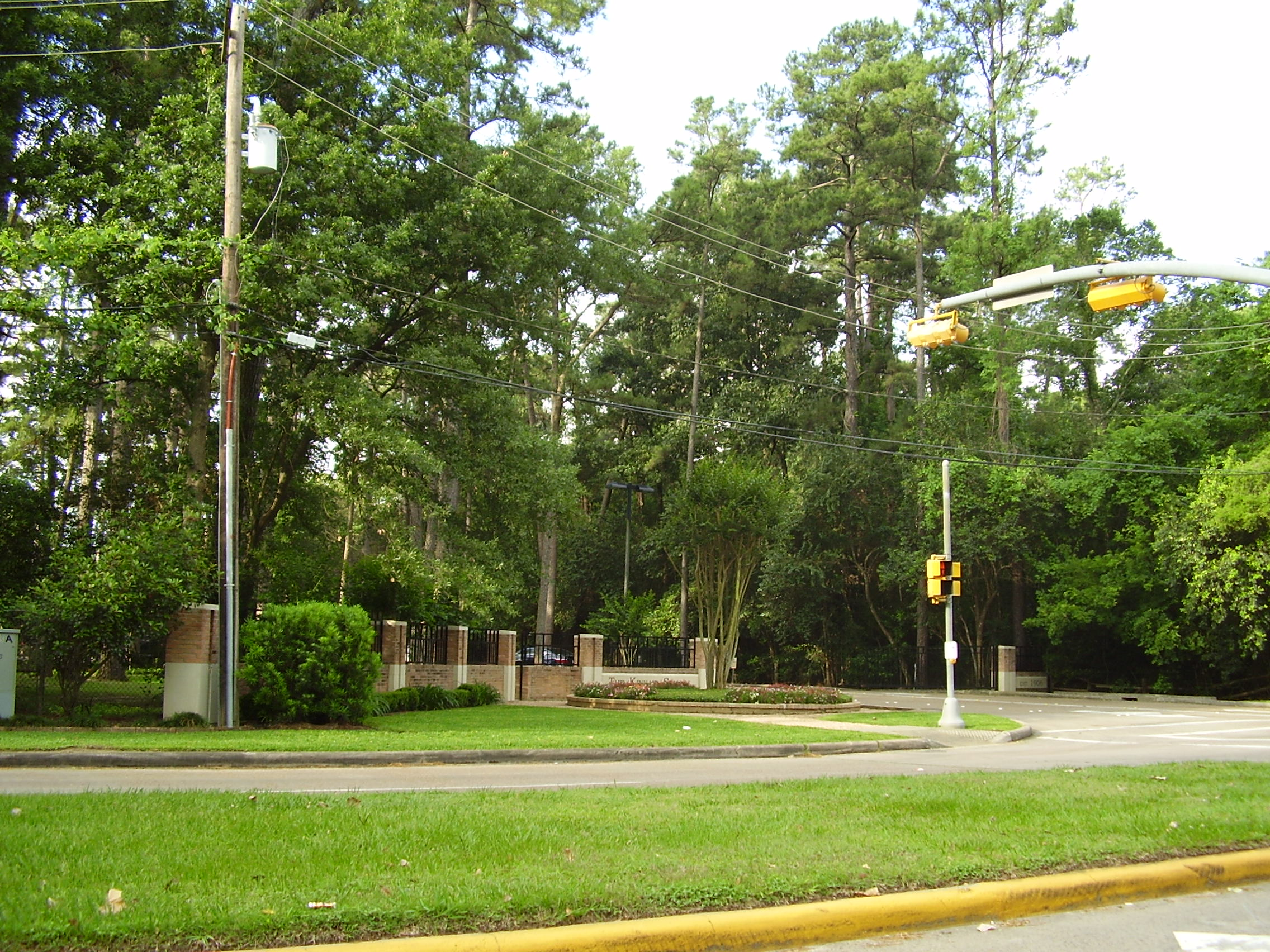
The Kinkaid School

The Kinkaid School, a private K–12 school, is located in Piney Point Village. The K–8 main campus of St. Francis Episcopal School is located in Piney Point Village while its high school and Primary School is in Houston.

St. Cecilia School, a K–8 Roman Catholic private school operated by the Roman Catholic Archdiocese of Galveston-Houston, is located in nearby Hedwig Village.

=== Colleges and universities ===
Both Spring Branch ISD and Houston ISD (and therefore all of Piney Point Village) are served by the Houston Community College System. The Northwest College operates the nearby Town & Country Square Campus in Houston.

=== Public libraries ===
It is served by the Spring Branch Memorial Branch of Harris County Public Library (the Spring Branch Memorial Branch is in Hedwig Village).

== Media ==
The Houston Chronicle is the area regional newspaper.

The Memorial Examiner is a local newspaper distributed in the community.

The Memorial Buzz is also the local Magazine which serves Bunker Hill Village, Hunters Creek Village, and Piney Point Village

== Postal services ==
The United States Postal Service uses "Houston" for all Piney Point Village addresses; "Piney Point" is not an acceptable city designation for mail addressed to places in Piney Point Village. Most of Piney Point Village is within the 77024 ZIP code, while the section south of the Buffalo Bayou has the 77063 ZIP code.

The United States Postal Service location serving 77024 is the Memorial Park Post Office at 10505 Town and Country Way, Houston, Texas, 77024-9998.

The location serving 77063 is the John Dunlop Post Office at 8728 Beverlyhill Street, Houston, Texas, 77063-9998.

== Notable people ==
- Eugene Cernan, the last man who walked on the Moon (during the 1972 Apollo 17 mission)
- Roger Clemens, former pitcher for the Houston Astros
- J. Howard Marshall, billionaire oil investor
- Mary Lou Retton, gymnast
- Kate Upton, model
- Justin Verlander, pitcher for the Detroit Tigers

== See also ==
- Spring Branch, Houston
- Memorial, Houston
