= Memorial High School (Hedwig Village, Texas) =

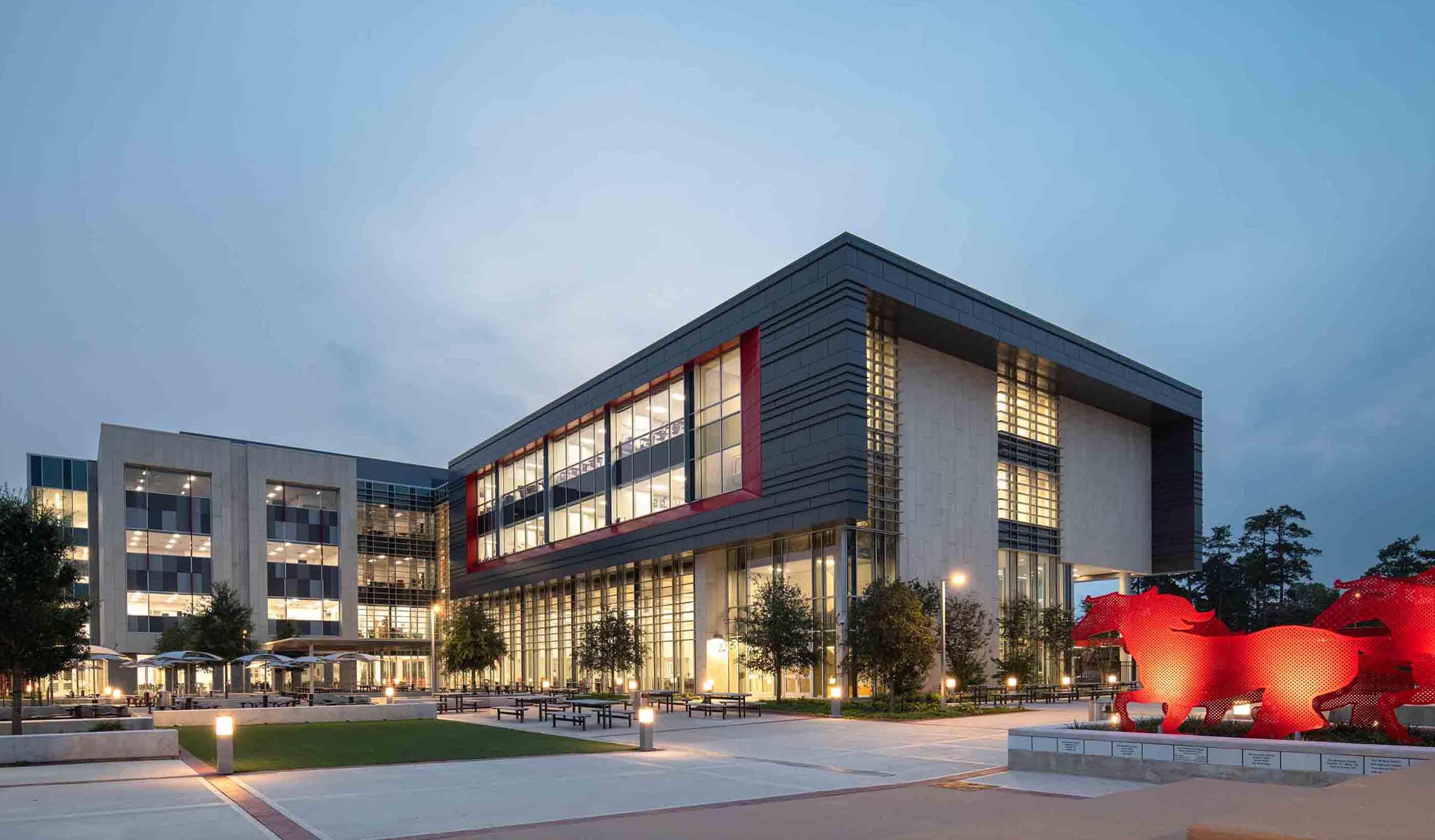

Location
- 935 Echo Lane; Houston, Texas 77024; United States; 29.78061°N 95.52278°W

Information
- Type: Public
- Opened: 1962
- School district: Spring Branch Independent School District
- Principal: Lisa Weir
- Teaching staff: 143.18 (FTE)
- Grades: 9 - 12
- Enrollment: 2,640 (2023-2024)
- Student to teacher ratio: 18.44
- Colors: Red and white
- Nickname: Mustangs
- Rival: Stratford High School
- Newspaper: The Anvil
- Yearbook: The Reata
- Website: mhs.springbranchisd.com

Memorial High School (MHS) is a secondary school located at 935 Echo Lane in Hedwig Village, Texas, United States, in Greater Houston. It has a Houston, Texas post office address.

Memorial serves students in portions of the Memorial and Spring Branch regions of Houston and several enclaves within the portions. Memorial is part of the Spring Branch Independent School District (SBISD) and serves grades 9 through 12. As of 2005, the district was granted a $500 million education grant, $150 million of which belongs to Memorial High School.

== History ==
Memorial Senior High School opened in 1962 to relieve overcrowding at Spring Branch High School. Memorial was the second high school to open in SBISD. At the time, students living north of Old Katy Road attended Spring Branch and students living south of Old Katy Road attended Memorial. This arrangement lasted until Spring Woods High School opened in 1964.

The design of the school was classic early 1960s in the South, with a large, open campus. Each classroom building opened into an outside breezeway, to maximize air flow as the school did not have air conditioning.

When Memorial first opened, the area surrounding the school was largely forest and rice fields, but it rapidly grew as new subdivisions were built, and by the mid-1960s, Memorial's enrollment exceeded 3,000 students, a number much larger than the school was meant to hold. This problem was resolved with the opening of Westchester Senior High School in 1967, and later Stratford Senior High School in 1974.

At the time, Memorial's main rivals were the Spring Branch Bears and Westchester Wildcats. However, by the mid-1980s, the enrollment of nearly every school across the district had dropped precariously, and it was decided that Westchester and Spring Branch High Schools would be closed. Memorial remained open, and took in students from both Westchester and Spring Branch High Schools.

Today, Memorial is the oldest high school still operating in Spring Branch ISD. The school has received extensive renovations, which began during the 1996–1997 school year. Every building in the school was gutted and refurbished, outdated facilities were replaced and the campus was made more secure.

In 2011, Memorial High School was named the #10 most posh public school in the country, as it pulls from a very wealthy area of Houston.

In January 2017 a vandal sprayed graffiti of racist symbols on the school property.

== Campus ==
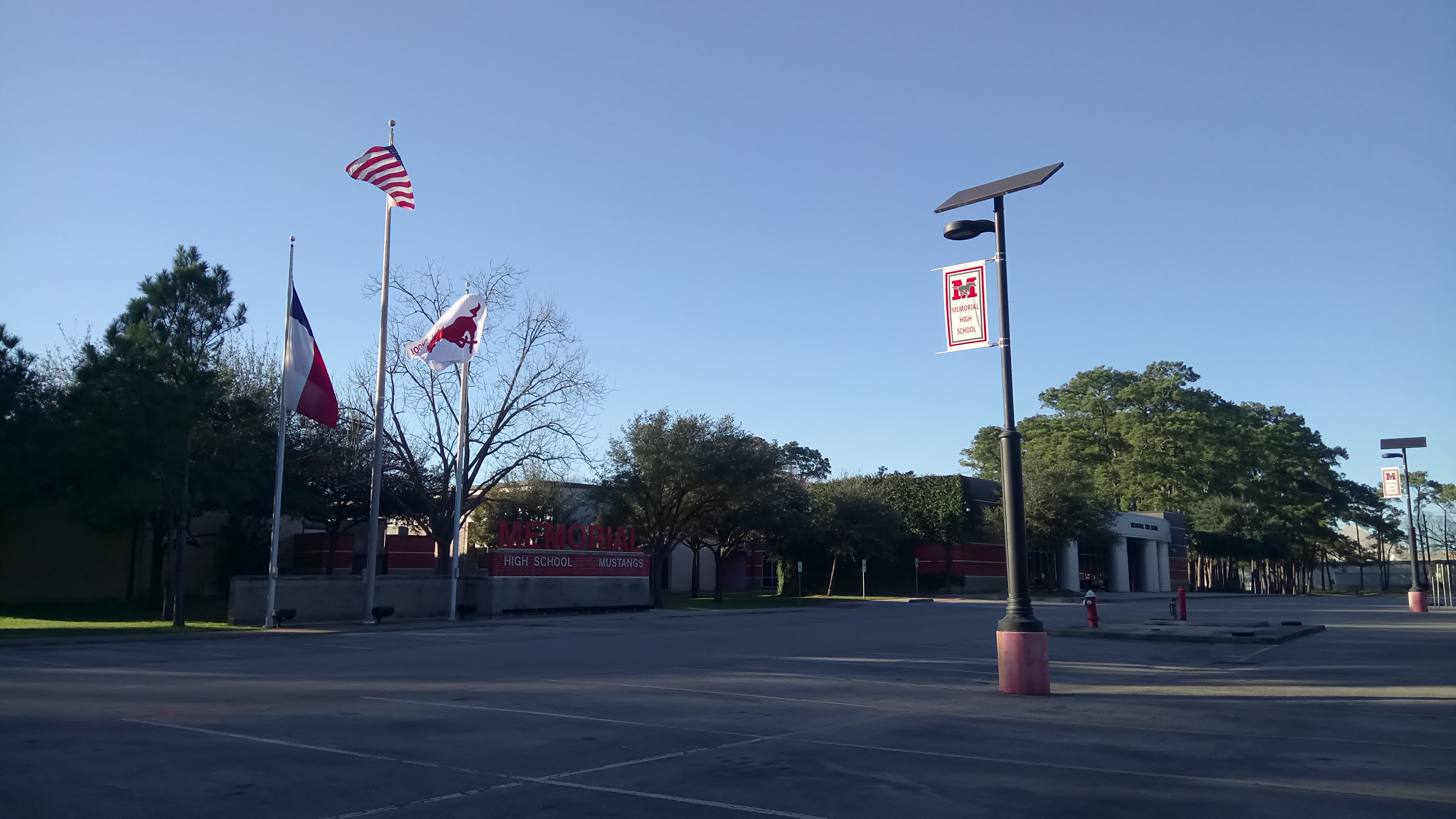
The inside of the school campus

The campus is two blocks south of Interstate 10. Memorial City Mall is to the West.

=== Campus renovations and expansion ===
As part of a districtwide facilities initiative, Spring Branch Independent School District (SBISD) approved an $898.4 million bond referendum in 2017, which passed with approximately 80 percent voter approval. The bond funded renovations and new construction across the district, including major upgrades to Memorial High School in Houston.

Memorial High School underwent a comprehensive modernization project with a total construction cost of $84.1 million. The district commissioned a master planning study that involved parents, teachers, community members, and district leadership. The resulting long-term plan addressed the entire campus and was divided into Phase I, which has been completed, and Phase II, scheduled for future implementation.

A major challenge of the project was the school’s landlocked campus, which limited opportunities for expansion. To accommodate new construction, the project relocated existing tennis courts and the bus loop, freeing space for a new academic building. The centerpiece of the renovation is a four-story, 161,249-square-foot academic building, which replaced six older classroom buildings originally constructed in the mid-20th century.

The new building includes 28 general classrooms, 21 science laboratories, collaborative learning areas, administrative offices, and a two-story student dining facility. The design emphasizes natural lighting, a central atrium, and modern circulation spaces. Interior features include acoustic ceilings, a main stairwell with transparent red railings, and murals reflecting the school’s Mustang mascot and colors.

In addition to academic upgrades, the project included extensive athletic and site improvements, such as new turf systems, safety netting, upgraded practice fields, a field house, and an eight-court tennis complex. Existing grass practice fields were also renovated.

Campuswide infrastructure improvements were completed to modernize the school, which was originally built in 1963. These upgrades included new mechanical, electrical, and plumbing systems, renovated restrooms, enhanced security features, reconfigured traffic flow, and updated parking to improve campus safety and efficiency.

The Design phase started in 2019, construction began in 2020, and it was completed in 2022.

The completed project significantly modernized Memorial High School’s facilities, enhancing instructional spaces, student amenities, and overall campus functionality while preserving the school’s established identity within the Memorial community.

== Neighborhoods served ==
Memorial serves students in all of the Memorial Villages (including Bunker Hill Village, Hedwig Village, Hilshire Village, Spring Valley Village, and most of Hunters Creek Village and Piney Point Village). While the school has a Houston address, it is located in the city of Hedwig Village, and it draws from a small portion of Houston in the Memorial and Spring Branch regions (including Stablewood, Afton Village, Brykerwoods, Monarch Oaks, Spring Oaks, Sandalwood, Whispering Oaks, and portions of Westview Terrace). A section of the Memorial City district is within the school's attendance zone. Memorial High School has eleven lunch vendors that deliver meals to students on campus during their respective lunch periods.

Since opening its doors in 1962, MHS has received several renovations and additions. The campus consists of 311,115 square feet.

== Athletics ==
Memorial has a rivalry with Stratford High School.

Memorial also has a successful football team, which went to the state semifinals in December 2010 in the Division II bracket. The 1979 Mustangs went all the way to the state finals, a school record as of yet unbeaten.

As of 2012, the Memorial tennis team had a district record of 73-0 and has finished in the state finals for 2010, 2011, and 2012. As of 2019 for Memorial has participated in 11 back to back trips to the UIL Team Tennis State Tournament. Of these tennis tournaments Memorial has won the state championship twice. However, in 2024, the Memorial tennis team was beaten in the regional finals by Seven Lakes High School, thus ending their 15 year streak of competing in the state championship.

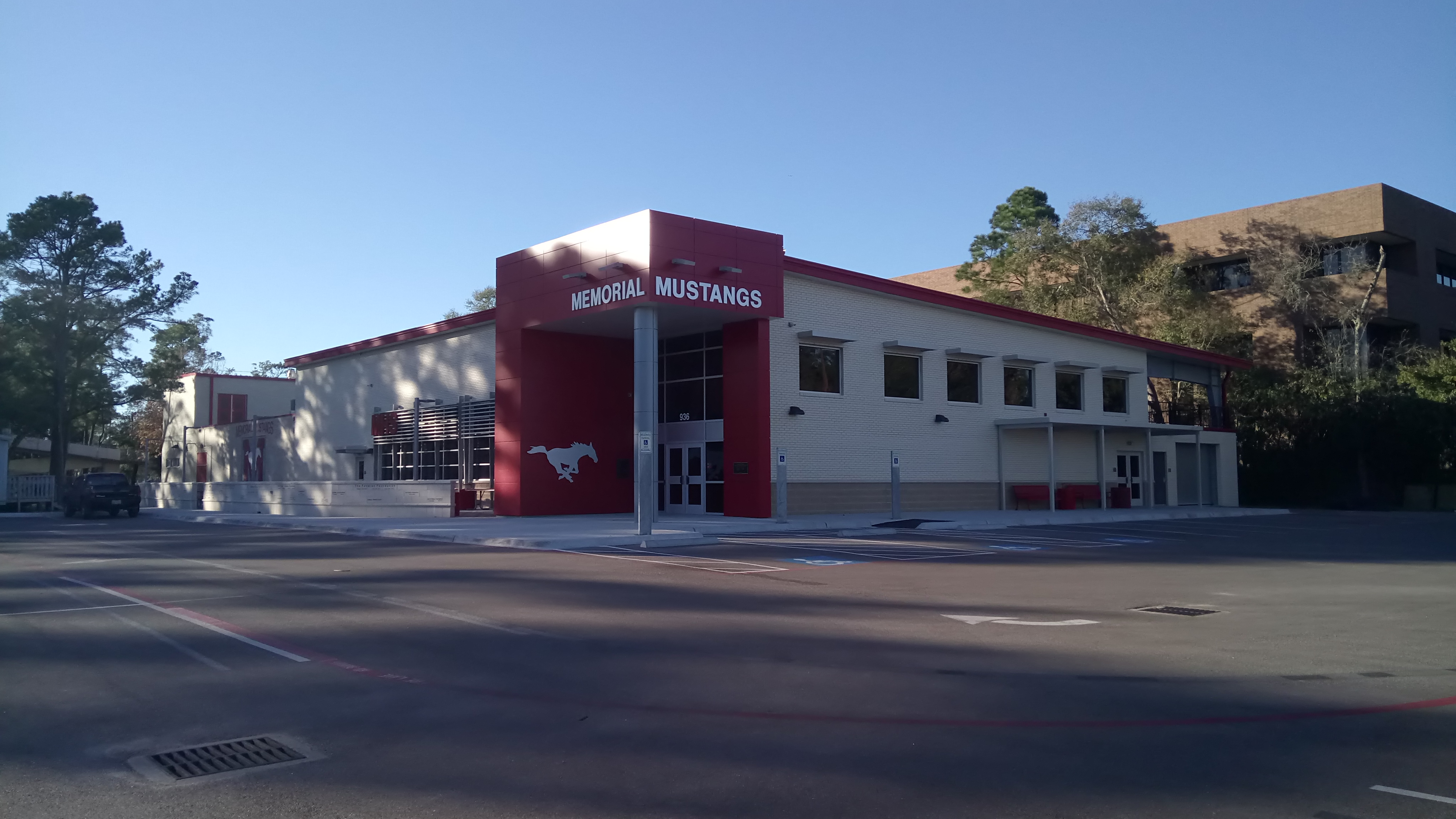
This is the Athletic Fieldhouse which contains a weight room and several offices for the Coaches it is mostly used by the football team.

Memorial has a men's basketball team that has had some success historically although it has not seen success in recent years. Under the school's original basketball coach, Don Coleman, they were able to win a state title in 1966. Memorial also has a girls' basketball team.

Memorial has both a boys' and girls' soccer team. The girls' team has had much success, most recently winning a state championship title in 2018.

Memorial's swimming and diving team has a long history of success. In the 1970s, Memorial High School won the UIL State championship for 4 straight years. In the 1990s, Anthony Robinson set national age group records and even a world record in the 50 Breastroke in 2001. More recently, the Mustangs have repeatedly placed in the top 10 at UIL State, and a slew of team records have been set.

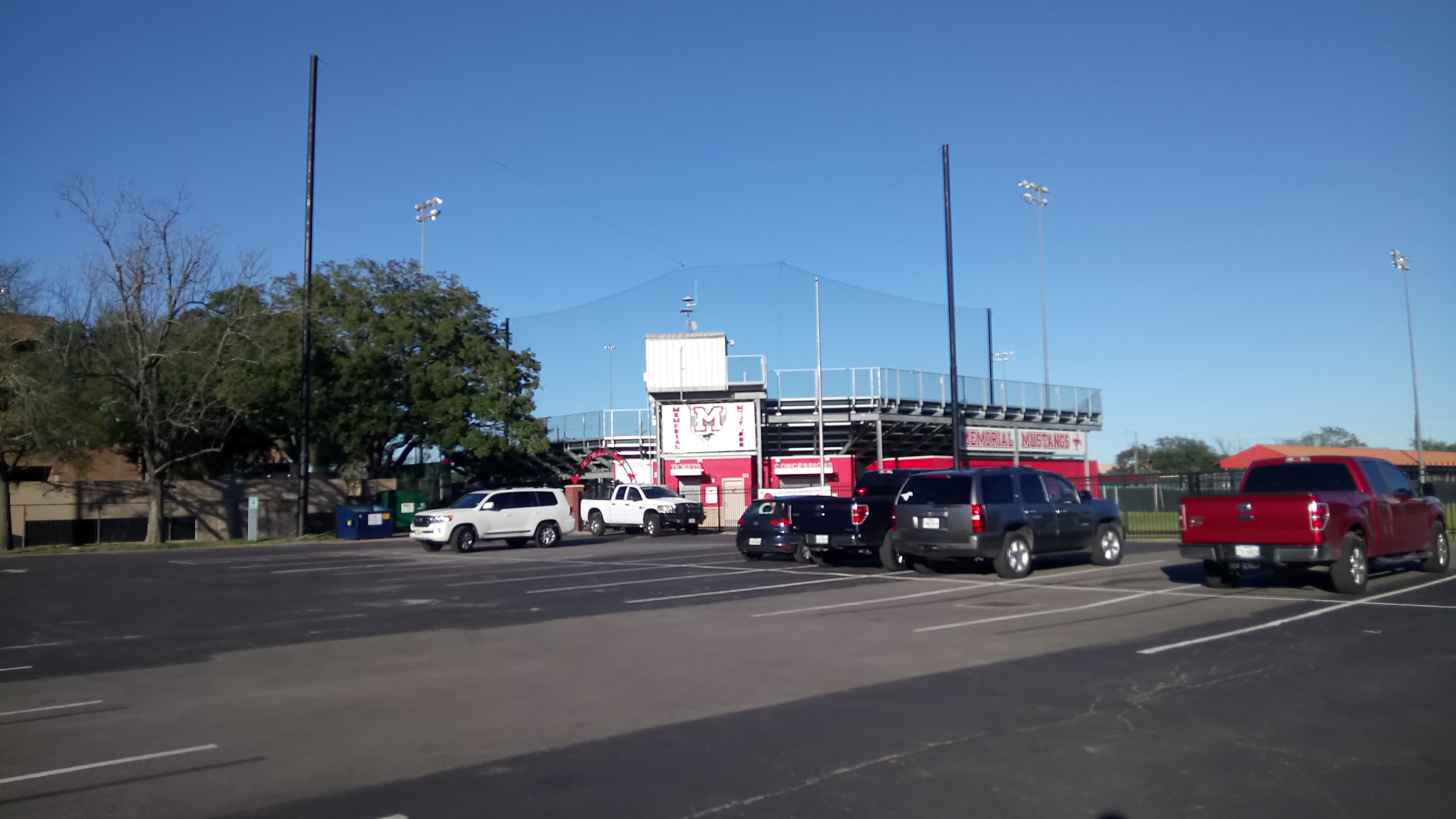
Memorial High Stadium

Memorial also has track & field, cross country, golf, baseball, softball, and volleyball teams. The school also has a club field hockey team for girls, and club lacrosse and rugby for both boys and girls.

Memorial High School Competes in District 20-6A (6A is the highest level of sports for Texas).

The Athletic Director and Head Football Coach is Brooks Haack.

=== State Championships ===
1965-1966 Boys Basketball State Champions.

1970-71 Boys Swimming State Champions.

1971-72 Boys Swimming State Champions.

1972-73 Boys Swimming State Champions.

1973-74 Boys Swimming State Champions.

1977-78 Boys Swimming State Champions.

1979-80 Boys Swimming State Champions

2017-18 Team Tennis State Champions.

2017-18 Girls Soccer State Champions.

2019-20 Team Tennis State Champions.

2025-26 Duo Mixed Tennis State Champions.

2026-27 Team Tennis State Champions.

=== UIL sports ===
Fall

- Water polo (boys and girls)
- Football
- Volleyball (girls)
- Cross country (boys and girls)
- Field hockey (girls)
- Cheerleading

Winter

- Swimming and diving (boys and girls)
- Basketball (boys and girls)
- Soccer (boys and girls)
- Wrestling (boys and girls)

Spring

- Baseball
- Softball
- Track and field (boys and girls)
- Tennis (boys and girls)
- Golf (boys and girls)

=== Club and non-UIL sports ===
- Lacrosse (boys and girls)
- Rugby
- Flag Football (Girls Only)

== Demographic information ==
As of 2019 according to STAAR data

- Total number of enrolled students: 2620
- Racial/Ethnic group:
  - Asian/Pacific Islander 16.25%
  - Hispanic/Latino 19.50%
  - Black 2.06%
  - White 59.06%
  - Native American 0.15%
  - Two or more races 2.98%
- Sex of Teachers:
  - Female Teachers 58.76%
  - Males Teachers 41.31%

== Awards and honors ==
Memorial was named a 1988-89 National Blue Ribbon School.

The school was ranked 258th, 133rd, 103rd, 126th, 225th, 307th, and 254th in Newsweek's 2003, 2005, 2006, 2007, 2010, 2012, and 2013 lists, respectively, of top high schools in the United States since the list's inception in 2003. (Note: Note that Newsweek did not compile a list in 2004.) It was also ranked 239th and 233rd in U.S. News' 2012 and 2013 lists, respectively, of top high schools in the United States.

Memorial was given the College Readiness Award by the Texas ACT Council in 2008 and 2010. The school was awarded the Just 4 The Kids (NCEA) High Performing School award in 2008 and 2009. In 2008, it was named an Honor Roll School by the Texas Business & Education Coalition. Memorial was named one of the Top 10 Best High Schools in the Area by Children at Risk in 2008, 2009, 2011, and 2012. It was also given the TAKS Gold Performance Award in 2012.

The school achieved "recognized" status in the accountability ratings system by the Texas Education Agency in 2000, 2001, 2002, 2004, 2005, 2008, 2009, 2010, and 2011. (Note: Note that no state accountability ratings were assigned in 2003 and 2012.)

It was awarded five stars and ranked in the top ten high schools in Texas by Texas Monthly magazine in 2002.

== Feeder patterns ==
=== Feeding from public schools ===
Elementary schools that feed into Memorial High School include:

- Bunker Hill
- Frostwood
- Hunters Creek
- Memorial Drive
- Valley Oaks
- Housman (partial)
- Rummel Creek (partial)
- Wilchester (partial)

Middle schools that feed into Memorial High School include:

- H. M. Landrum (partial)
- Memorial Middle School (partial)
- Spring Branch Middle School (partial)

=== Feeding from private schools ===
Some private schools, such as First Baptist Academy, Grace School, Presbyterian School, River Oaks Baptist School, St. Francis Episcopal Day School, and The Regis School of the Sacred Heart, have students that matriculate into Memorial.

== Notable alumni ==
- Ed Young — Lead Pastor of Fellowship Church
- Reid Gettys - Houston Cougars basketball player in 1980’s Phi Slama Jama era
- Michael Dell — founder and CEO of Dell, Inc
- Jeffery Hildebrand—Founder Hilcorp Energy Company
- Michael Simms — publisher, founder of Autumn House Press
- David Fahrenthold — 2017 Pulitzer Prize-winning journalist and author
- Sarah Isgur - Political commentator
- Anthony Robinson - Former 50 Breastroke world record holder, NCAA Finalist, Stanford alumni
- Jennifer Williams — Diplomat
- Steve Munisteri — chairman of the Republican Party of Texas from 2010 to 2016.
- Alex Kim — State Judge, 323rd District Court of Tarrant County, Texas
- Bill Baumann — former San Antonio attorney
- Cory Morrow — country singer and songwriter
- Walker Lukens — singer-songwriter
- Otto Wood — drummer of Waterparks (band)
- Doug Dawson — former NFL Offensive Lineman
- Gene Chilton — former NFL Offensive Lineman
- Kiki DeAyala — former NFL Linebacker
- Graham Godfrey — Former Major League Baseball Pitcher
- Chrisian Roa — Pitcher in Minor League Baseball
- Wayne Taylor — former Catcher and Left Fielder in Minor League Baseball
- Andrea Gardner Swift, mother of singer-songwriter Taylor Swift and instrumental in supporting Taylor’s efforts to regain ownership of her master recordings; attended Memorial High School (Hedwig Village, Texas)
- Kacy Clemens — former First Baseman in Minor League Baseball, and son of Roger Clemens
- Kody Clemens — former Second Baseman in Minor League Baseball, and son of Roger Clemens
- Koby Clemens — former Catcher, First Baseman, and Third Baseman, and son of Roger Clemens
- Kevin Ahrens — former Third Baseman in Minor League Baseball. Drafted 16th overall in the 2007 MLB draft.

== Controversies ==
=== 2015 Homecoming Dance at Children’s Museum ===
In November 2015, Memorial High School held its homecoming dance at the Children’s Museum of Houston with about 1,000 students in attendance. The event ended early—around 11 p.m.—after students were described as “rowdy,” disrespectful toward museum staff, and caused damage to a concession stand, including breaking an ice cream maker.

=== 2017 Graffiti ===
Memorial was shocked in January 2017 when vandals broke into the school over winter break and vandalized the campus with racist graffiti. The vandalism included a crudely drawn swastika, multiple uses of the n-word, pentagrams, the phrase "white power," sexually explicit phrases and offensive symbols. The Anti-Defamation League would take notice of this event and comment on it, bringing notoriety to the event.

=== Thug Day ===
Memorial would face controversy in May 2019 over a spirit week tradition of "Thug Day' which was tweeted out by an upset student and went viral. Critics would claim that the event was racially insensitive to African-Americans and was an example of cultural appropriation due to the utilization of basketball jerseys, cornrows, do-rags, gang signs, and fake tattoos. Critics would range from media organizations and alumni to the local chapter of the NAACP. Memorial High would go on to cancel the 'spirit week' over the racist undertones of 'thug day' which the school claimed was an unofficial extension of the spirit week's 'jersey day.' Students went on to claim that campus tension increased as a result of the fallout, alongside mixed reception from alumni.

=== Sexual misconduct ===
In December 2023, a teacher at Memorial High School was placed on administrative leave after being accused of having inappropriate sexual misconduct with a former student. The teacher is facing felony charges for their relationship with a former student.

== Notes ==
Preceded by Governor's School	National Academic Championship champion 1996	Succeeded by Edison High School

Preceded by Houston Jones High School	Texas 4A State Basketball Champions; 1966	Succeeded by San Antonio Lee High School
