= Stablewood, Houston =

Community in Texas, USA

Coordinates: 29.771°N 95.462°W

Stablewood is a 72-acre (29 ha) community in Houston, just outside the 610 Loop. It is in proximity to the Houstonian Hotel, Club, and Spa.

== History ==
Jim and Margaret Elkins and Walter Mischer, Sr. developed Stablewood, and Mark Kilkenny was in charge of property development. Stablewood was incorporated in 1992. Stablewood was developed on the family country estate of Harry C. Wiess. The Wiess family had owned an interest in the land since the 1920s. The estate included a house designed by John Staub in 1930. The stable, which the Wiess family had converted into a party house, is located on a dedicated 3-acre (1.2 ha) site.

The developers modeled Stablewood after North and South Boulevard in Boulevard Oaks. Stablewood was one of the first subdivisions to be built in central Houston since the 1960s, and the first subdivision established in the Tanglewood area in a span of over 20 years. Stablewood was scheduled to include 135 houses ranging upwards from $375,000 in 1989 dollars.

In the 1990s the developers transferred maintenance and management responsibilities to the Property Owners Association.

== Cityscape ==
The community includes 135 lots for houses. They were originally scheduled to be priced at $375,000 and higher in 1989 dollars, with prices at around $30 per foot in 1989 dollars. The community was to have six oversized lots. The largest lot, which has 1.5 acres (0.61 ha) of land, was to have a $2 million in 1989 dollars price.

The community includes eight streets. All of them are privately owned. A guardhouse, located on Memorial Drive, controls access into the community. Residents may use key cards to enter and exit through the other main entrance, on Post Oak Boulevard. Houses in Stablewood are required to have more than 4,200 square feet (390 m^{2}) of space. When the houses were built, they were to have a minimum price of $800,000. As of 2011 the community includes 121 houses.

== Government ==
Harris Health System (formerly Harris County Hospital District) designated Northwest Medical Center for ZIP code 77024. The nearest public hospital is Ben Taub General Hospital in the Texas Medical Center.

== Education ==
The community is within the Spring Branch Independent School District. Residents are zoned to Hunters Creek Elementary School, Spring Branch Middle School, and Memorial High School.

== Notable residents ==
- Beverly Woolley owned property in Stablewood. Around 1994 she planned to build a house in the subdivision.
