= Stratford High School (Houston) =

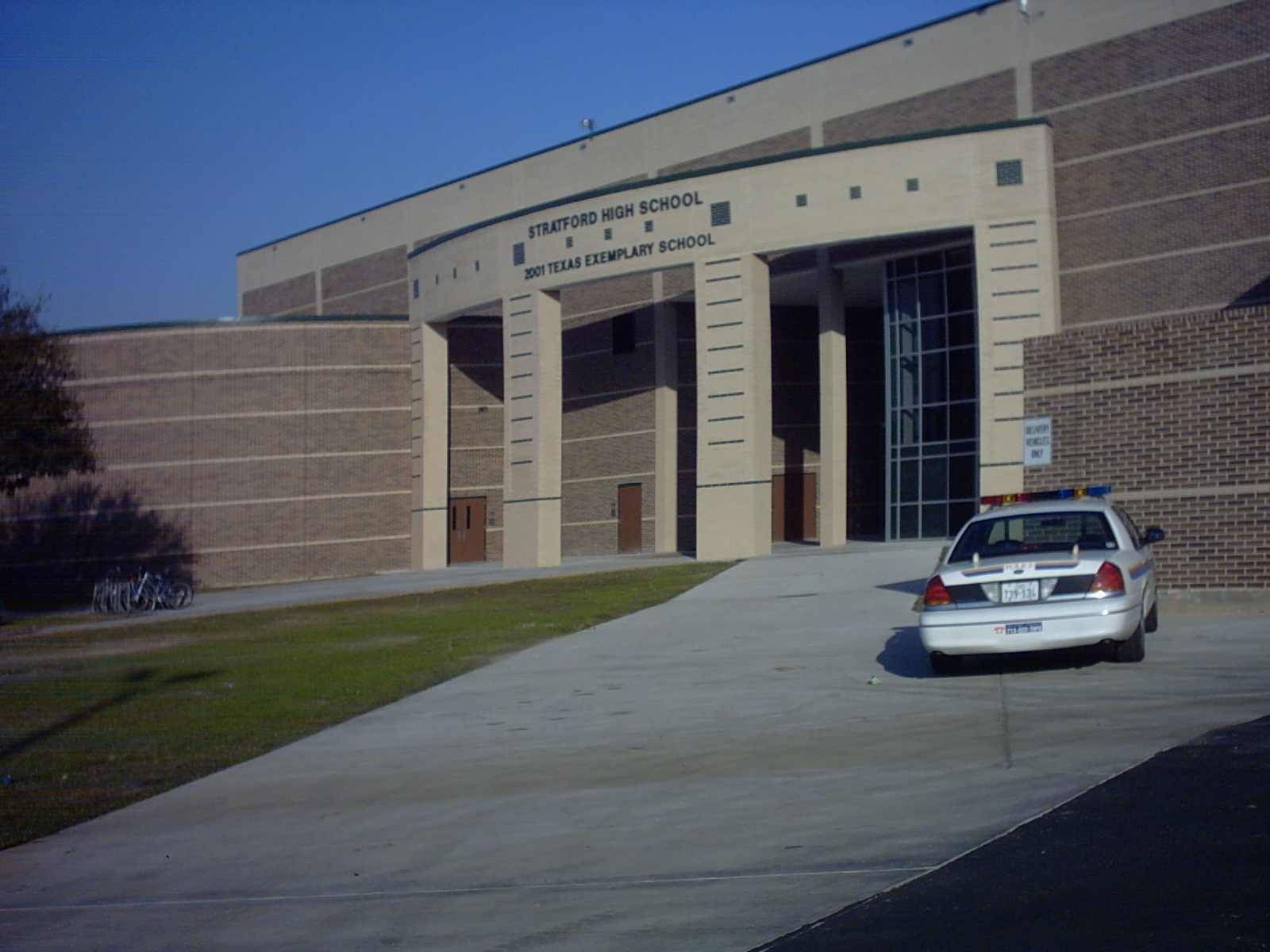

Location
- 14555 Fern; Houston, TX 77079; United States; 29°46′29″N 95°36′15″W

Information
- Type: Public
- Motto: "Excellence without exemptions"
- Established: 1974
- School district: Spring Branch Independent School District
- Principal: Raymorris Barnes
- Staff: 109.03 (FTE)
- Grades: 9–12
- Student to teacher ratio: 21.21
- Colors: Green and white
- Athletics: Baseball, basketball, cross country, diving, football, golf, lacrosse, soccer, softball, swimming, tennis, track & field, volleyball
- Mascot: Spartan
- Rival: Memorial High School
- Website: ssh.springbranchisd.com

Stratford High School is a secondary school in Houston, Texas, United States. The school is one of four high schools in the Spring Branch Independent School District (SBISD), the district's westernmost secondary school (serving grades 9 through 12). Stratford High School serves several neighborhoods, including Westchester, Sherwood Oaks, Nottingham Forest, Nottingham West, Wilchester, Gaywood, Wilchester West, Yorkshire, Memorial Townhomes, Village on Memorial Townhomes, Memorial Way, Rustling Pines, Memorial Plaza, and the SBISD portions of Thornwood and Ashford Forest.

Stratford provides courses in the traditional academic subjects, as well as several foreign languages, technology, vocational education, athletics, and fine arts. Several different Advanced Placement (AP) courses are offered at Stratford.

In keeping with the theme of its mascot, Stratford's student newspaper is The Oracle, and its yearbook is Mnemosyne.

== Feeder patterns ==
Elementary schools that feed into Stratford include:

- Meadow Wood
- Nottingham
- Thornwood
- Wilchester
- Rummel Creek (partial)
- Sherwood (partial)
- Spring Woods

Middle schools that feed into Stratford include:

- Spring Forest Middle School
- Memorial Middle School (partial)

=== Feeding from private schools ===
Students of some private schools, such as First Baptist Academy, Grace School, and John Paul II School, continue to Stratford.

== History ==
Stratford first opened in the 1973–1974 school year. It was built to relieve the overflow of students at the nearby Westchester High School. The overflow had been caused by of the rapid development of subdivisions like Yorkshire, Wilchester, and Nottingham. The school district quickly decided to open a new school when the student population at Westchester nearly tripled to 4,000. Prior to the opening of the Stratford facility, Stratford's students were housed in temporary buildings on the Westchester campus. The opening of Stratford was not completed on schedule due to construction delays, causing students to continue to languish in cramped quarters. The 1974 Freshman Class graduated in 1977 as the first four class of the school. The first class to graduate from Stratford was the 1975 Class.

In the 1980s, the population of Spring Branch Independent School District fell drastically. This was attributed to jobs lost to the oil crisis that affected the Houston area. Many Houston families left or moved out of the upper, middle-class area, causing an underutilization of campus space. The school district voted to close four schools: Spring Branch High School, Westchester High School and two junior highs. Students from both high schools were sent to Memorial High School with most Westchester students going to Stratford. (Westchester students who attended Memorial Junior High were given the choice of attending either Memorial or Stratford.) Students in the first mixed Stratford/Westchester graduating class of 1986 were given the choice of wearing their former Westchester High School color orange gown at graduation. Stratford, for many years, had a permanent display case dedicated to memorabilia from Westchester High School. In recent history, Stratford has maintained its enrollment at around 2000 students.

Stratford was named a 1983–84 National Blue Ribbon School.

Around 1999–2000 the Japanese Language Supplementary School of Houston, the Japanese supplementary school of Houston, moved its classes from Westchester Education Center to Stratford, but around 2000-2001 the school moved its classes back to Westchester.

In 2004, the building which housed Stratford was found to have massive structural problems, including bricks falling out of the building exterior, which required immediate attention. The Stratford campus was closed, and the students were moved to the Westchester Academy for International Studies while repairs went on at the Stratford campus. This move posed a challenge because the Westchester facility could no longer handle a student body as large as Stratford's. Many noted the irony of the temporary move, noting that when Westchester was closed, many Westchester students were sent to Stratford, and now the situation had reversed itself. Stratford moved back into its regular facility in 2005.

The Spartans were the 1978 4A and 1987 5A State Football Champions.

In the 2006–2007 football season, the Spartans won the district title.

In February 2008 the UIL announced that Stratford would be realigned to Class 4A, District 23 effective in the 2008–2009 school year. The new alignment affected not only football, but all UIL activities. The schools in the new district stretched from Richmond to Bay City and El Campo. Spring Branch ISD appealed the realignment, citing outrage at the loss of a 34-year-long rivalry with Memorial High School, as well as concern that Stratford would have the most travel of any Houston-area school. In the appeal hearing, the UIL ruled that Stratford would be allowed to remain in Class 5A, and the Spartans were assigned to District 18, where they faced the three other SBISD schools (including Memorial), three high schools from Alief ISD, and private school Strake Jesuit. Stratford was later reclassified as a 4A school, but still played Memorial in the annual "Green Out" football game. With the 2014 UIL reclassification and realignment, Stratford became 5A.

== Athletics ==
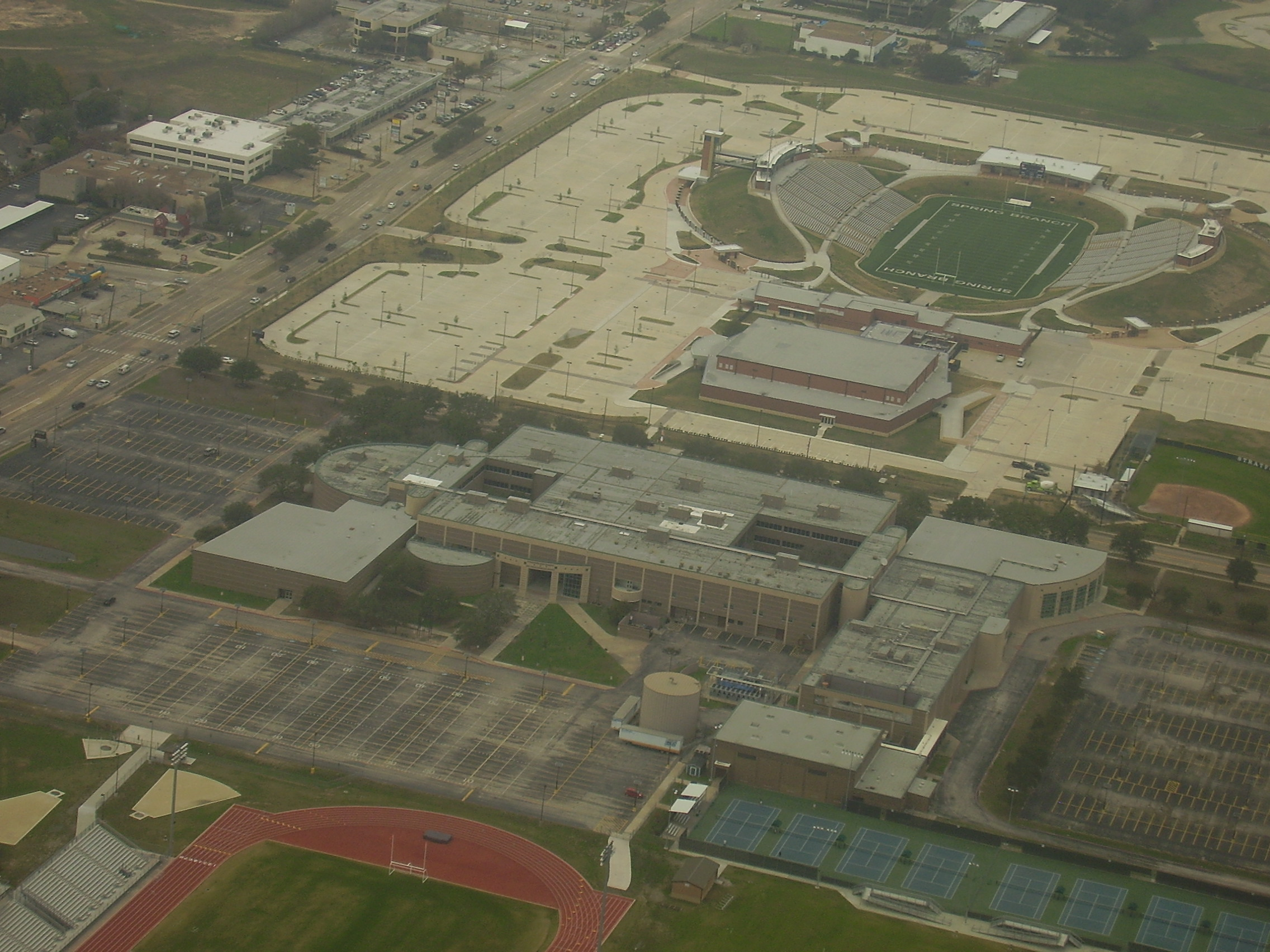
Stratford and Tully Stadium, viewed by air

Stratford competes athletically with other schools in the sports of baseball, basketball, cross country, diving, football, golf, soccer, softball, swimming, tennis, track & field and volleyball. Stratford has a long-standing rivalry with fellow SBISD high school Memorial High School.

The Spartans Baseball program has placed numerous players into top college programs and 13 into the professional level, with 3 MLB players in history: Dean Crow, Chris James and Chance Sanford.

=== Realignment ===
The University Interscholastic League's biennial reclassification and realignment was unveiled on Monday February 1, 2010. As part of the realignment, Stratford moved to a 4A classification along with two other SBISD schools, Northbrook and Spring Woods.

Northbrook, Spring Woods and Stratford joined 17-4A with Brenham, Magnolia, Magnolia West, Montgomery and Waller in 2011. As of the 2013 school year, the Spartans moved, yet again, to 18-4A in another realignment released in early February 2012.

In the 2014 UIL realignment, Stratford was moved yet again to 5A.

== Awards and honors ==
Stratford was named a 1983-84 National Blue Ribbon School.

The school was ranked 168th in 2010, 168th in 2011, 700th in 2012, and 774th in 2013 in the U.S. by Newsweek. Stratford was also named a Gold Medal School by U.S. News & World Report in 2012 and 2013, ranking 497th and 500th. It was named a Silver Medal School by U.S. News & World Report in 2008 and 2009.

Stratford was named an Honor Roll School by the Texas Business & Education Coalition in 2008. The school was also given the Texas Education Agency Gold Performance Award in 2008, 2009, 2010, and 2011. It was named a No Place for Hate School by the Anti-Defamation League in 2008, 2009, 2010, and 2011. Stratford was also given the College Readiness Award by the Texas ACT Council in 2009, 2010, and 2011. The school was given the State Farm Good Neighbor Award in 2009 and 2010 for its community service.

The school has gained "exemplary" status in the accountability ratings system by the Texas Education Agency in 2002. It has also gained "recognized" status in 2000, 2004, and 2010. (Note: Note that no state accountability ratings were assigned in 2003 and 2012.)

== Notable alumni ==
- John Allen Nelson, actor/writer, class of 1977.
- Clint Black, country music singer
- Kevin Booth, documentary filmmaker
- Jeremiah Briscoe, ex-NFL and CFL player, 2x Walter Payton Award winner.
- Steve Brudniak, artist, actor, and musician.
- Andrew Craig, retired professional Mixed Martial Artist
- Dean Crow, MLB pitcher
- Kelly Emberg, supermodel
- Lauren Grandcolas (née Catuzzi), author, marketing executive, and passenger on United Airlines Flight 93, September 11, 2001
- Bill Hicks, stand-up comedian
- Chris James, MLB utilityman, also played at Blinn College
- Craig James, former New England Patriots running back and ESPN sports commentator
- David Klingler, former quarterback for the University of Houston and Cincinnati Bengals
- Jimmy Klingler, quarterback
- Andrew Luck (2012), former NFL quarterback for the Indianapolis Colts (2012–2018); selected first overall in the 2012 NFL draft; four-time Pro Bowler
- Marc Ostrofsky, New York Times bestselling author of Get Rich Click!
- Chance Sanford, MLB infielder
- Chuck Thomas, NFL center, guard, and long snapper, who won two Super Bowls with the San Francisco 49ers in 1988 and 1989
- Jordyn Brooks, NFL LB Drafted by Seahawks and now on Miami Dolphins.
