= Japanese Language Supplementary School of Houston =

- ヒューストン日本語補習校

Location
- Location of the teaching campus
- 901 Yorkchester Drive; Houston, Texas, 77079; United States; 29°46′49″N 95°34′57″W

Information
- Type: Private supplementary Japanese school
- Established: 1971 (reported founding); 1972 (reported opening)
- Grades: Kindergarten–12
- Affiliation: Japan Business Association of Houston
- Administrative office: 1880 South Dairy Ashford Road, Suite 170; Houston, TX 77077
- Website: www.jeihouston.org

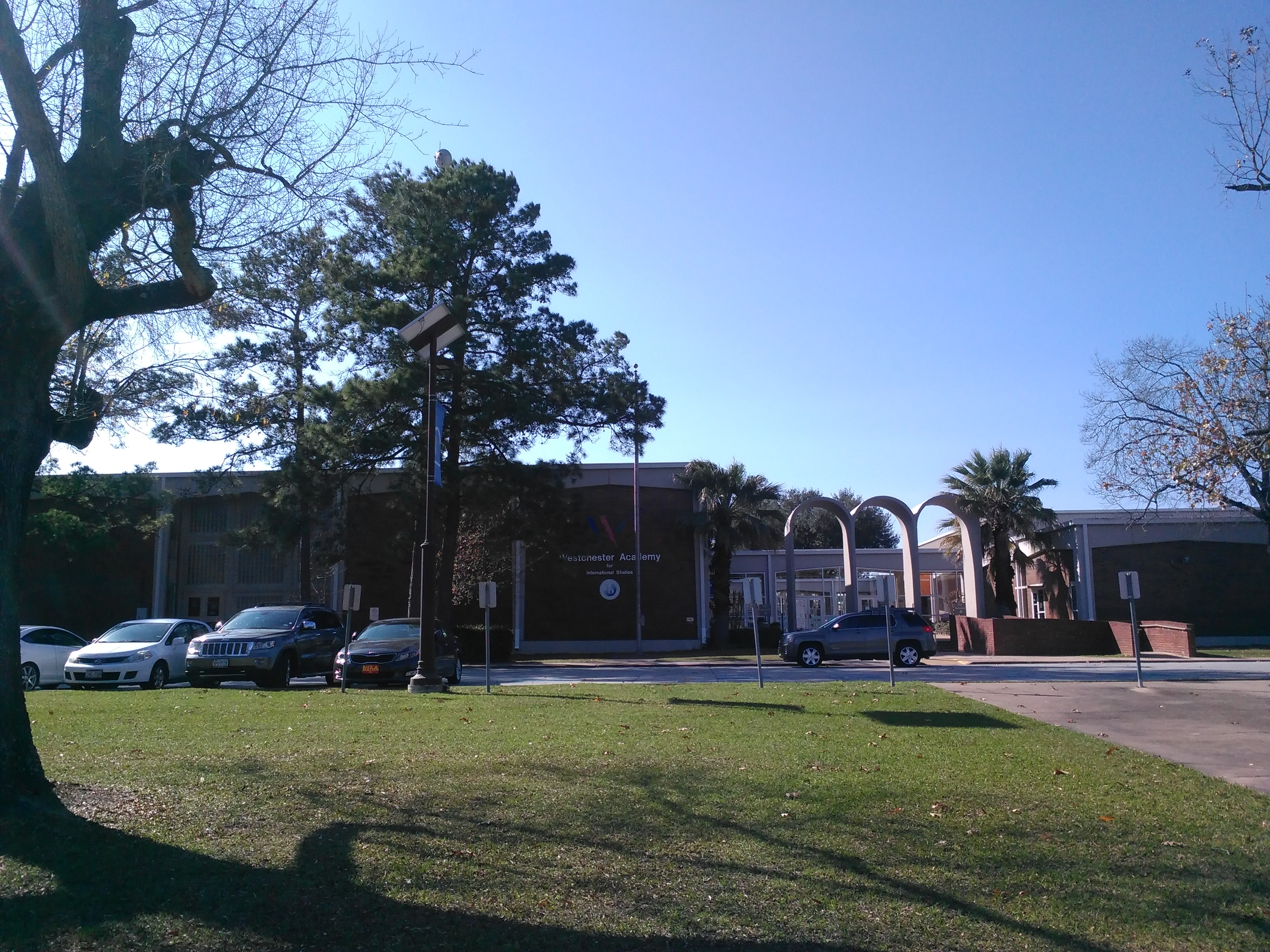
Westchester Academy for International Studies, the location of the classes

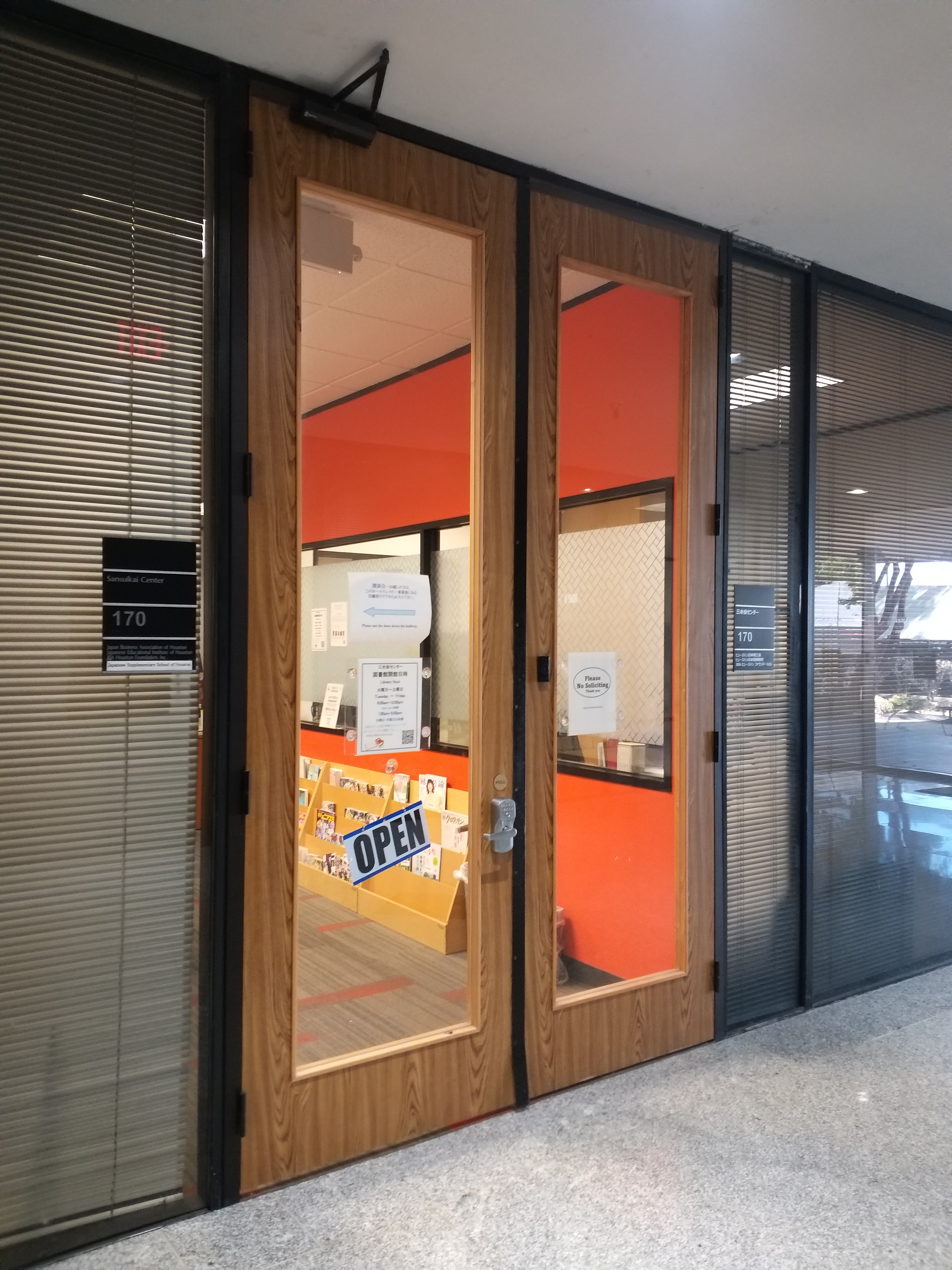
The school offices are located at the Sansui-Kai Center (三水会センター)

The Japanese Language Supplementary School of Houston (ヒューストン日本語補習校, Hyūsuton Nihongo Hoshūkō; JLSSH) is a supplementary Japanese school in Houston, Texas. Its classes are held at the Westchester Academy for International Studies. and the school office is located in the Memorial Ashford Place office building. The school, operated by the Japanese Educational Institute (JEI, ヒューストン日本語教育振興会 Hyūsuton Nihongo Kyōiku Shinkō Kai), is for children between ages 5 and 18 who are Japanese speakers. Many of the students are temporarily residing in the United States.

As of 2020 the principal is Tōshiaki? Ide (井手 登士昭, Ide Tōshiaki?).

== History ==
The school opened in 1972. The original purpose was to give a Japanese-style supplementary education to children of businesspeople stationed in Houston for terms of three to five years, so they do not fall behind on Japanese classwork when they return to Japan. The school's first classes were held at the South Main Baptist Church. In 1974 classes moved to Tallowood Baptist Church, and on August 20, 1983 another campus at Holy Spirit Episcopal Church opened. On March 25, 1986 the school moved its classes to the Westchester Education Center.

In March 1989 the school had 379 students, including non-Japanese.

On May 25, 1999 the school moved its classes to Stratford High School, and classes there began on May 29. On August 12, 2000, however, the school moved its classes back to Westchester.

Previously the school held classes for American high school students at the T.H. Rogers School.

In 2015 the school had 480 students. Its student population increased by 71% within the previous two-year period.

== Curriculum and operations ==
The school offers grades 1 through 12 and uses the Japanese school year calendar, a trimester system beginning in April and ending in March. It teaches courses in the Japanese language, including calligraphy. It also teaches social studies, science, and mathematics; the school education committee chairperson, Yasutomo Katsuno, stated that the school offers the courses in subjects other than the Japanese language "because they need to (be able to) read the same question in Japanese, too." In 1989 Yuko Leibrock, the secretary, stated that the school had 23 teachers. On weekdays, over half of those teachers do not teach at schools. The Japanese Ministry of Education appoints the school principal, who serves on a three-year shift. As of 1987 Houston Independent School District (HISD) high school students can take courses from the Japanese school to earn high school credit. Spring Branch Independent School District (SBISD) students may take JEI Japanese courses on Saturdays.

As of 1989, the Japanese government provided 10% of the funding, and tuition and the Japanese Business Association of Houston (JBA; ヒューストン日本商工会 Hyūsuton Nihon Shōkōkai) cover the remainder of the budget. In 1989 the tuition was determined by the age of the student and ranged from $40 ($103.89 according to inflation) to $50 ($129.87 according to inflation).

== See also ==
- History of the Japanese in Houston
- Japanese language education in the United States
