= Beverly Woolley =

American politician (born 1939)

Beverly Massey Woolley

Member of the Texas House of Representatives from the 136th district
- In office 1995–2013
- Preceded by: Ashley Smith
- Succeeded by: Tony Dale (redistricted)

Personal details
- Born: July 25, 1939 (age 87)
- Party: Republican
- Education: University of Houston

Beverly Massey Woolley (born July 25, 1939) is a former Republican member of the Texas House of Representatives representing District 136 which had covered the part of Harris County, Texas, before the district was moved to suburban Austin in Williamson County.

Woolley was the co-chair of the Tea Party caucus in the Texas House. In 2011, Woolley was chosen to replace the Democrat Craig Eiland of Galveston as Speaker pro tempore after Republicans captured a super majority of seats (101 of 150) in the 2010 elections.

Woolley owned property in the Stablewood subdivision in Houston and in 1994 had planned to build a house in the subdivision.
