= Hedwig Village, Texas =

City of Hedwig Village
- City
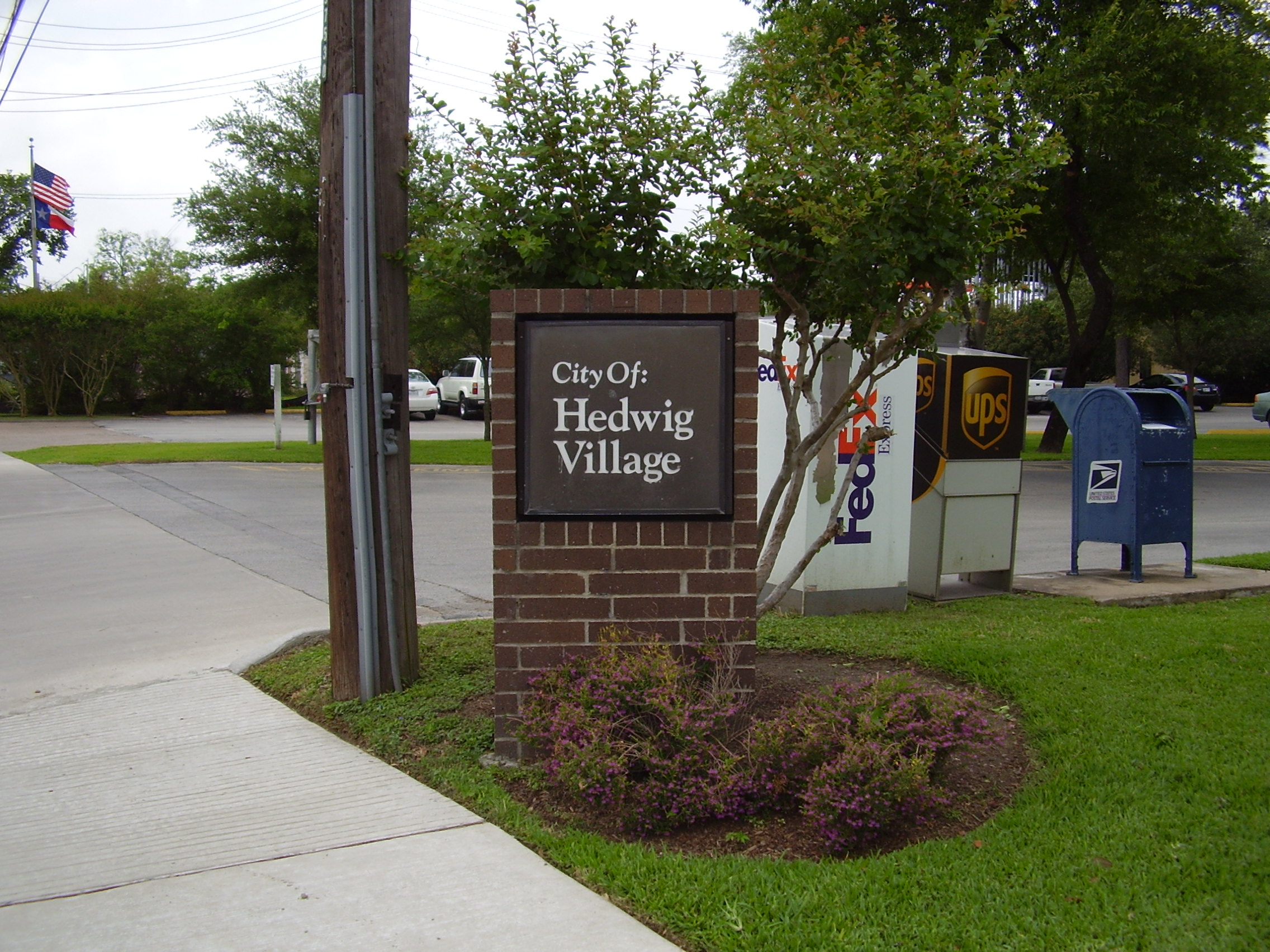
- Sign indicating Hedwig Village

- Location in Harris County and the state of Texas
- Coordinates: 29°46′48″N 95°31′10″W
- Country: United States
- State: Texas
- County: Harris
- Established: Unknown

Government
  - Mayor: Tom Jinks

Area
  - Total: 0.95 sq mi (2.45 km^{2})
  - Land: 0.95 sq mi (2.45 km^{2})
  - Water: 0 sq mi (0.00 km^{2})
- Elevation: 43 ft (13 m)

Population (2020)
  - Total: 2,370
  - Density: 2,783/sq mi (1,074.5/km^{2})
- Time zone: UTC-6 (CST)
  - Summer (DST): UTC-5 (CDT)
- ZIP code: 77024
- Area code: 713
- FIPS code: 48-33068
- GNIS feature ID: 1374028
- Website: www.hedwigtx.gov

Hedwig Village is a city in Harris County, Texas, United States. The population was 2,370 at the 2020 census.

== History ==
The Spring Branch Memorial area was originally settled by German immigrants in the 19th century. Hedwig Village's name originates from Hedwig Road, which was built on the property of Hedwig Jankowski Schroeder; Schroeder emigrated from Germany to Texas in 1906 to help her sister operate a business in Houston. There she met, and married, Henry Schroeder, son of Jacob Schroeder, one of the area's earliest immigrants. They established their home and farmed in the area now known as Hedwig Village.

In the mid-1950s, efforts to form a Spring Branch municipality failed. Hedwig Village was incorporated on December 23, 1954 and established a zoning ordinance in 1955. Because of the 1955 incorporation, Houston did not incorporate Hedwig Village's territory into its city limits, while Houston annexed surrounding areas that were unincorporated. Hedwig Village incorporated because residents feared that Houston would annex them. Around 1963, residents of Hedwig Villages and other Memorial villages wanted what Gia Gustilo of the Houston Chronicle referred to as "a more country-like atmosphere in close proximity to Houston." Laverne Coller, a resident, quoted in the Houston Chronicle who moved to Hedwig Village in 1963, was paraphrased by Gustilo as "Hedwig Village is unique among the villages in that it was the only municipality to accept the existing commercial sector, which was quite a bonus to the city's revenues."

In 1960, the city had 1,182 residents. By 1966, the community had two schools, one library, and two churches. By 1970, the city had 3,255 residents, and in 1971 the city completed a park. The city had 3,994 residents in 1980 and 2,616 in 1990. Coller said in 2003 that many children of early Hedwig Village residents had begun to settle the Hedwig Village area. In 2003 Coller, as paraphrased by Gustilo, said "Despite the changes, several of her old neighbors remain and the camaraderie with new residents is good."

== Geography ==
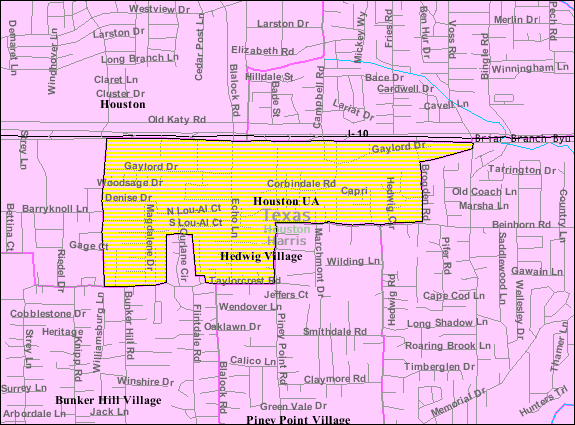
Map of Hedwig Village

Hedwig Village is located at 29°46′48″N 95°31′10″W (29.779990, –95.519412).

According to the United States Census Bureau, the city has a total area of 0.9 square miles (2.3 km^{2}), all land. This makes Hedwig Village one of the smallest municipalities in Harris County. Hedwig Village is 10 miles (16 km) from Downtown Houston.

=== Cityscape ===
When Hedwig Village was first established, houses were similar to ranch houses and there were more private dirt roads than paved streets. Katy Road (now Interstate 10, Katy Freeway) had many neighborhood stores, according to Laverne Coller.

In 2003, Edith Spang, a former librarian at the Spring Branch Memorial Branch Library quoted in the Houston Chronicle, said that as time passed, the civic locations, including the library; the medical care facilities; the shopping venues; and the traffic were all parts of Hedwig Village's growth Spang remarked that Hedwig Village "has definitely changed along with the other villages. It's lost the sleepy little country atmosphere." Coller said that none of the stores that had originally existed when she moved still existed by 2003.

== Demographics ==
Historical population
| Census | Pop. | Note | %± |
|---|---|---|---|
| 1960 | 1,182 | | — |
| 1970 | 3,255 | | 175.4% |
| 1980 | 2,506 | | −23.0% |
| 1990 | 2,616 | | 4.4% |
| 2000 | 2,334 | | −10.8% |
| 2010 | 2,557 | | 9.6% |
| 2020 | 2,370 | | −7.3% |
U.S. Decennial Census; 1850–1900 1910 1920 1930 1940; 1950 1960 1970; 1980 1990 2000; 2010 2020

Hedwig Village first appeared as a city in the 1960 U.S. census.

=== Racial and ethnic composition ===
Hedwig Village city, Texas – Racial and ethnic composition Note: the US Census treats Hispanic/Latino as an ethnic category. This table excludes Latinos from the racial categories and assigns them to a separate category. Hispanics/Latinos may be of any race.
| Race / Ethnicity (NH = Non-Hispanic) | Pop 2000 | Pop 2010 | Pop 2020 | % 2000 | % 2010 | % 2020 |
|---|---|---|---|---|---|---|
| White alone (NH) | 1,816 | 1,766 | 1,567 | 77.81% | 69.07% | 66.12% |
| Black or African American alone (NH) | 30 | 33 | 36 | 1.29% | 1.29% | 1.52% |
| Native American or Alaska Native alone (NH) | 4 | 5 | 11 | 0.17% | 0.20% | 0.46% |
| Asian alone (NH) | 290 | 395 | 322 | 12.43% | 15.45% | 13.59% |
| Native Hawaiian or Pacific Islander alone (NH) | 1 | 3 | 0 | 0.04% | 0.12% | 0.00% |
| Other race alone (NH) | 3 | 6 | 10 | 0.13% | 0.23% | 0.42% |
| Mixed race or Multiracial (NH) | 44 | 68 | 109 | 1.89% | 2.66% | 4.60% |
| Hispanic or Latino (any race) | 146 | 281 | 315 | 6.26% | 10.99% | 13.29% |
| Total | 2,334 | 2,557 | 2,370 | 100.00% | 100.00% | 100.00% |

=== 2020 census ===
As of the 2020 census, there were 2,370 people, 878 households, and 720 families residing in the city. The median age was 43.6 years.

26.8% of residents were under the age of 18 and 17.3% of residents were 65 years of age or older.

For every 100 females there were 95.4 males, and for every 100 females age 18 and over there were 92.0 males age 18 and over.

100.0% of residents lived in urban areas, while 0.0% lived in rural areas.

There were 878 households in Hedwig Village, of which 41.0% had children under the age of 18 living in them. Of all households, 58.0% were married-couple households, 15.1% were households with a male householder and no spouse or partner present, and 23.8% were households with a female householder and no spouse or partner present. About 20.8% of all households were made up of individuals and 11.0% had someone living alone who was 65 years of age or older.

There were 1,044 housing units, of which 15.9% were vacant. The homeowner vacancy rate was 2.3% and the rental vacancy rate was 15.7%.

Racial composition as of the 2020 census
| Race | Number | Percent |
|---|---|---|
| White | 1,652 | 69.7% |
| Black or African American | 38 | 1.6% |
| American Indian and Alaska Native | 15 | 0.6% |
| Asian | 325 | 13.7% |
| Native Hawaiian and Other Pacific Islander | 0 | 0.0% |
| Some other race | 79 | 3.3% |
| Two or more races | 261 | 11.0% |
| Hispanic or Latino (of any race) | 315 | 13.3% |

=== 2000 census ===
As of the 2000 census, there were 2,334 people, 956 households, and 668 families residing in the city. The population density was 2,706.5 inhabitants per square mile (1,045.0/km^{2}). There were 1,038 housing units at an average density of 1,203.7 per square mile (464.8/km^{2}). The racial makeup of the city was 81.41% White, 1.33% African American, 0.17% Native American, 12.43% Asian, 0.04% Pacific Islander, 2.01% from other races, and 2.61% from two or more races. Hispanic or Latino of any race were 6.26% of the population.

There were 956 households, out of which 35.8% had children under the age of 18 living with them, 55.6% were married couples living together, 11.2% had a female householder with no husband present, and 30.1% were non-families. 27.4% of all households were made up of individuals, and 9.9% had someone living alone who was 65 years of age or older. The average household size was 2.44 and the average family size was 2.99.

In the city, the population was spread out, with 26.6% under the age of 18, 5.4% from 18 to 24, 26.9% from 25 to 44, 25.8% from 45 to 64, and 15.3% who were 65 years of age or older. The median age was 41 years. For every 100 females, there were 89.4 males. For every 100 females age 18 and over, there were 83.5 males.

The median income for a household in the city was $66,250, and the median income for a family was $101,928. Males had a median income of $69,375 versus $41,316 for females. The per capita income for the city was $52,153. About 3.0% of families and 4.6% of the population were below the poverty line, including 6.1% of those under age 18 and 4.0% of those age 65 or over.

== Infrastructure and government ==
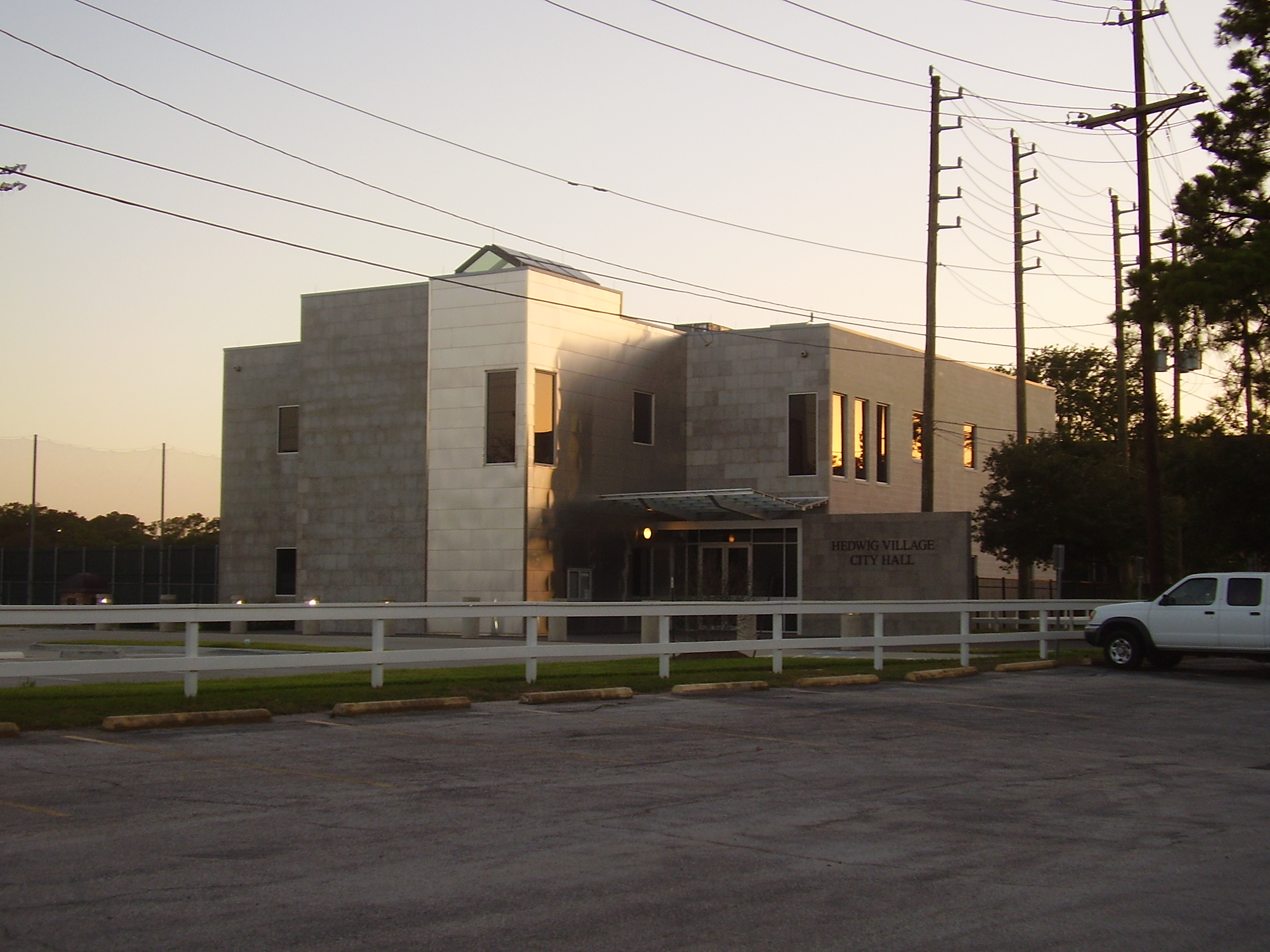
Hedwig Village City Hall

As of 2022 the mayor of Hedwig Village is Tom Jinks. The council members are, in their respective council positions by number, Scott Davis, Patrick J. Breckon, Clay Trozzo, Matt Woodruff, and Shirley Rouse.

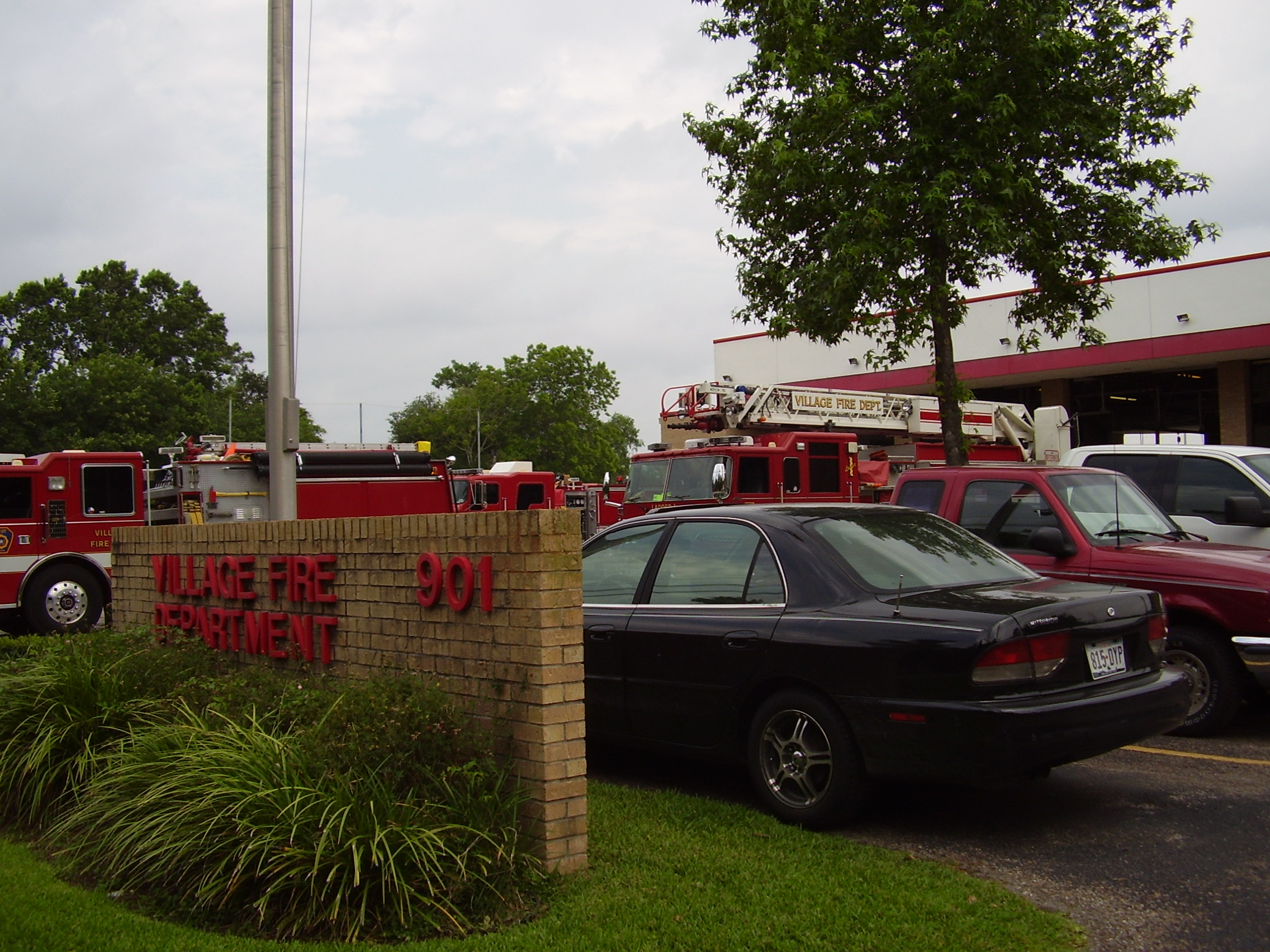
Village Fire Department

The Village Fire Department serves all of the Memorial villages. Laverne Coller said that voter turnout numbers are high in Hedwig Village, and that "[t]he people in Hedwig Village are a very responsible, dedicated group of citizens. We have had council people who serve term after term voluntarily even though they don't get much glory."

Hedwig Village operates its own police force. The village is within the Memorial Villages Water Authority. Laverne Coller said that, as paraphrased by Gia Gustilo of the Houston Chronicle, "seems to attract professionals perhaps" because Hedwig Village has its own police force.

Harris County Precinct Three, headed by Steve Radack as of 2008, serves Hedwig Village.

Hedwig Village is located in District 133 of the Texas House of Representatives. As of 2022 Jim Murphy represents the district. Hedwig Village is within District 7 of the Texas Senate; as of 2022 Paul Bettencourt represents the district.

Hedwig Village is in Texas's 7th congressional district; in 2008, The pro-Republican Party publication Human Events identified the zip code 77024 as the zip code that gave the eighth largest contribution to John McCain's 2008 U.S. Presidential Election campaign. The zip code, which includes Hedwig Village, gave $540,309 United States dollars by October 24, 2008. As of 2019, however, the 7th congressional district is represented by a Democrat, Lizzie Pannill Fletcher.

Harris Health System (formerly Harris County Hospital District) designated Northwest Health Center for ZIP code 77024. The nearest public hospital is Ben Taub General Hospital in the Texas Medical Center.

== Politics ==
In the 2016 presidential election, Hedwig Village went to Republican nominee Donald Trump with 716 votes (60%) while Democratic nominee Hillary Clinton received 423 votes (36%). In the 2020 presidential election, Hedwig Village tallied 813 votes (61%) for Republican nominee Trump and 498 votes (37%) for Democratic nominee Joe Biden. In the 2024 presidential election, Republican nominee Trump garnered 824 votes (63%) in Hedwig Village to Democratic nominee Kamala Harris's 458 votes (35%).

== Parks and recreation ==
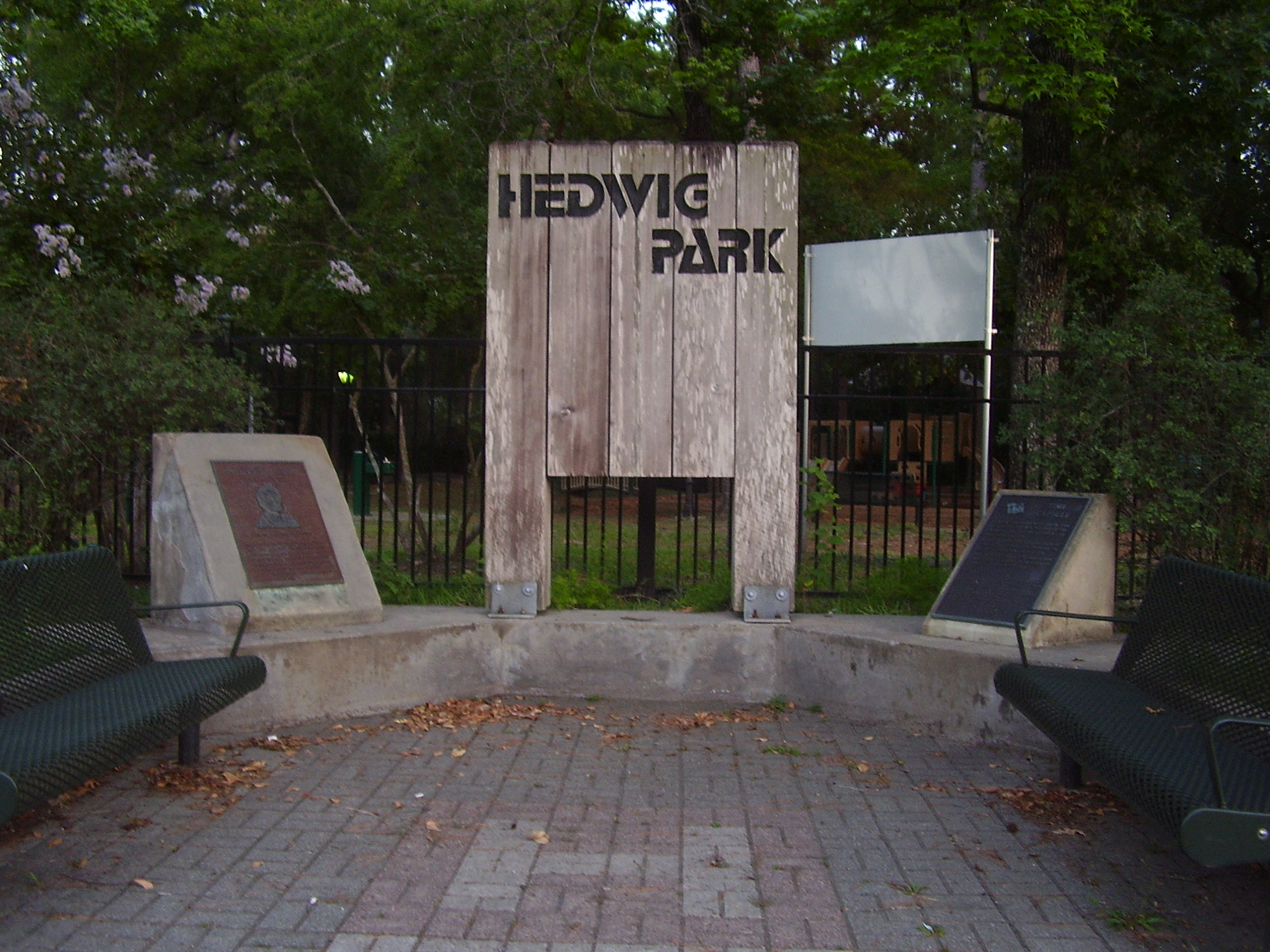
Hedwig Park

The city operates Hedwig Park, located on Corbindale Road. Hedwig Park has picnic areas and gazebos. It is in proximity to the Spring Branch Memorial Library. The Houston Business Journal said "Children find the location especially exciting because it's just across the street from the Village Fire Department." The park in Hedwig Village is named after Hedwig Jankowski Schroeder.

== Education ==
=== Colleges and universities ===
Spring Branch ISD (and therefore Hedwig Village) is served by the Houston Community College System. The Northwest College operates the nearby Spring Branch Campus in Memorial City, Houston.

=== Primary and secondary schools ===
==== Public schools ====
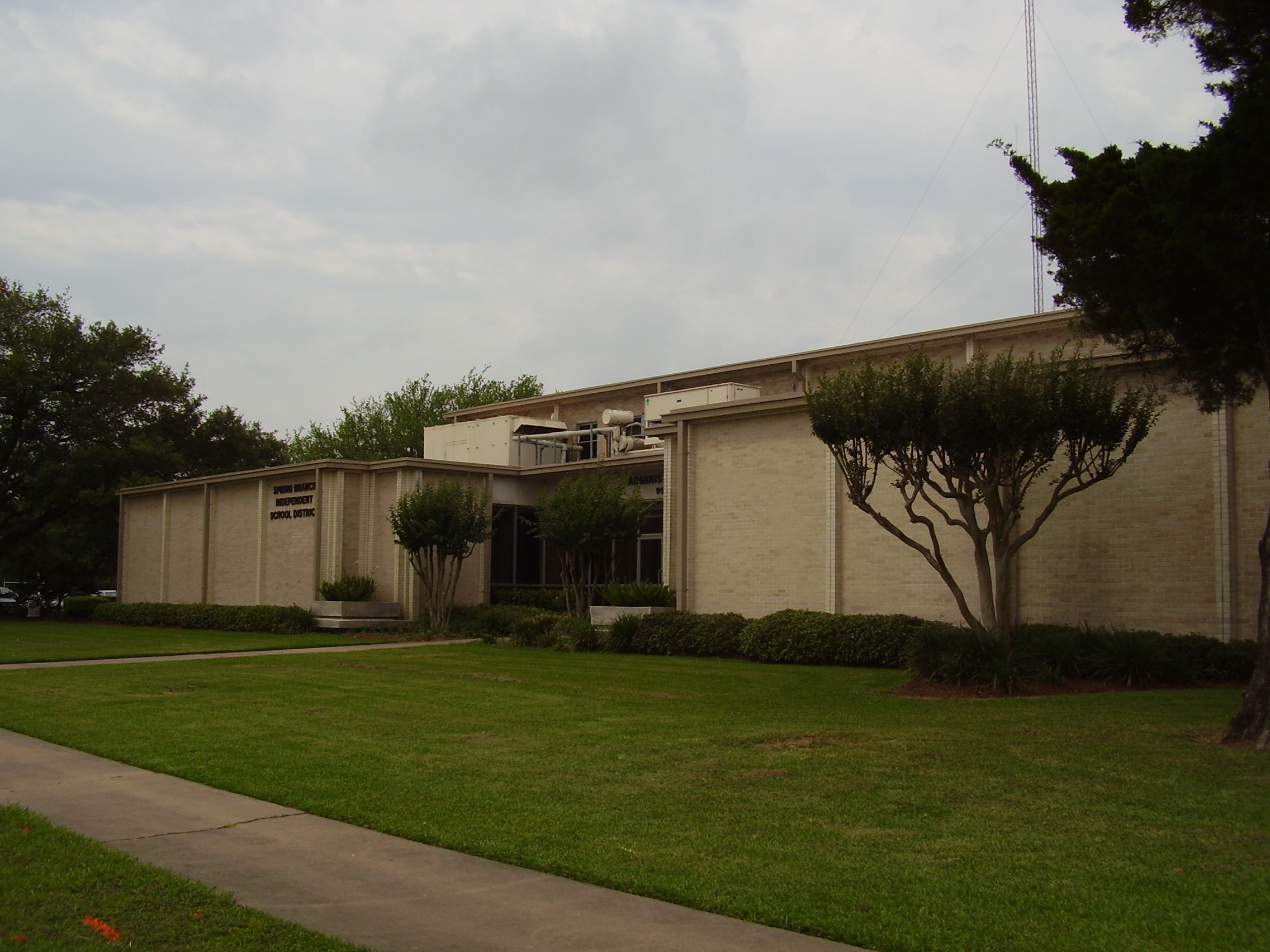
Spring Branch Independent School District Administration Building

Hedwig Village is served by the Spring Branch Independent School District, which has its headquarters in Hedwig Village.

All residents are assigned to Wildcat Way School in Houston for preschool.

Some Hedwig Village students are zoned to Memorial Drive Elementary School in Piney Point Village. Some Hedwig Village students are zoned to Bunker Hill Elementary School in Bunker Hill Village.

All Hedwig Village students are zoned to Spring Branch Middle School and Memorial High School, which are located in Hedwig Village.

===== Gallery of public schools =====
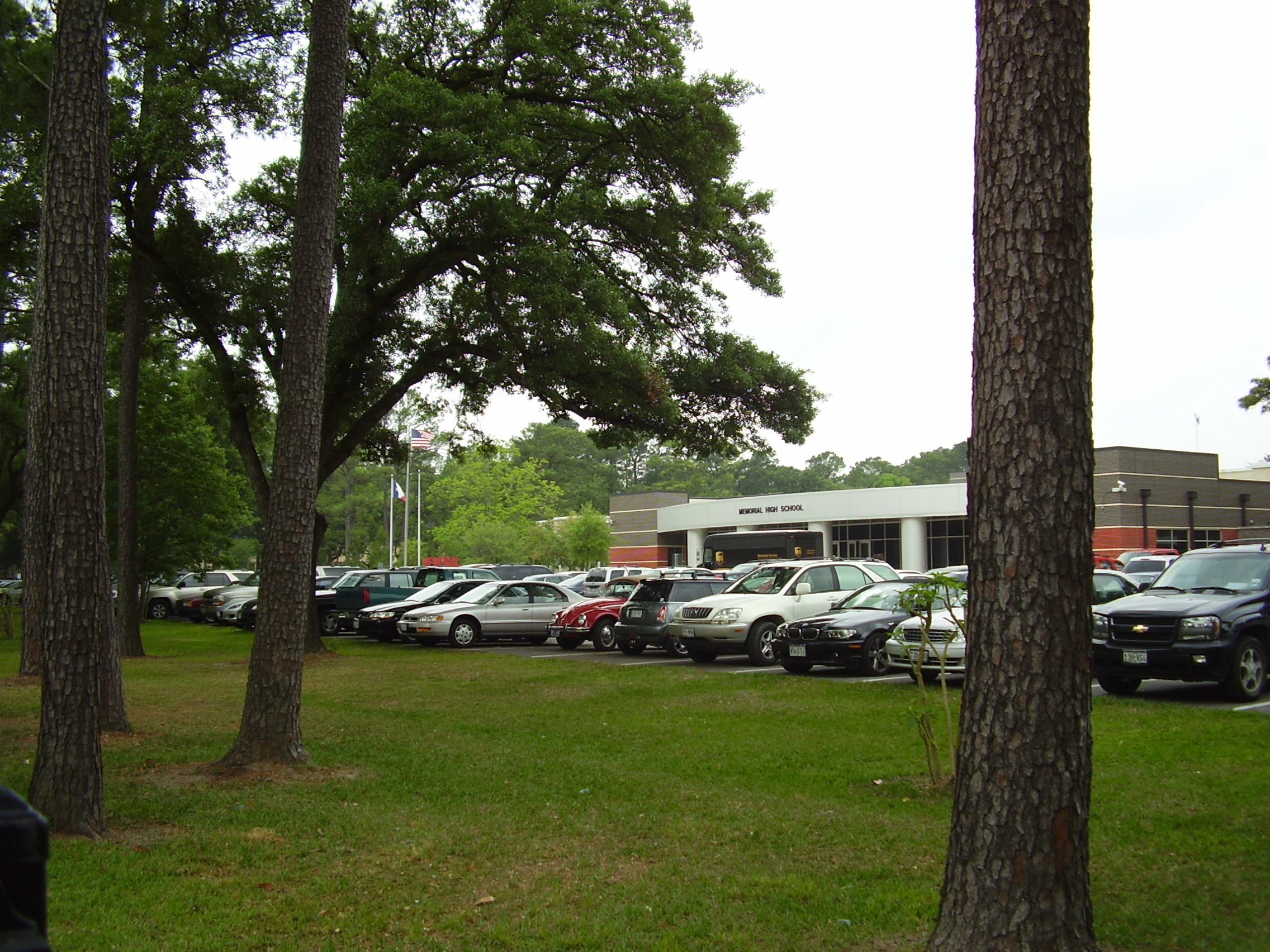
Memorial High School

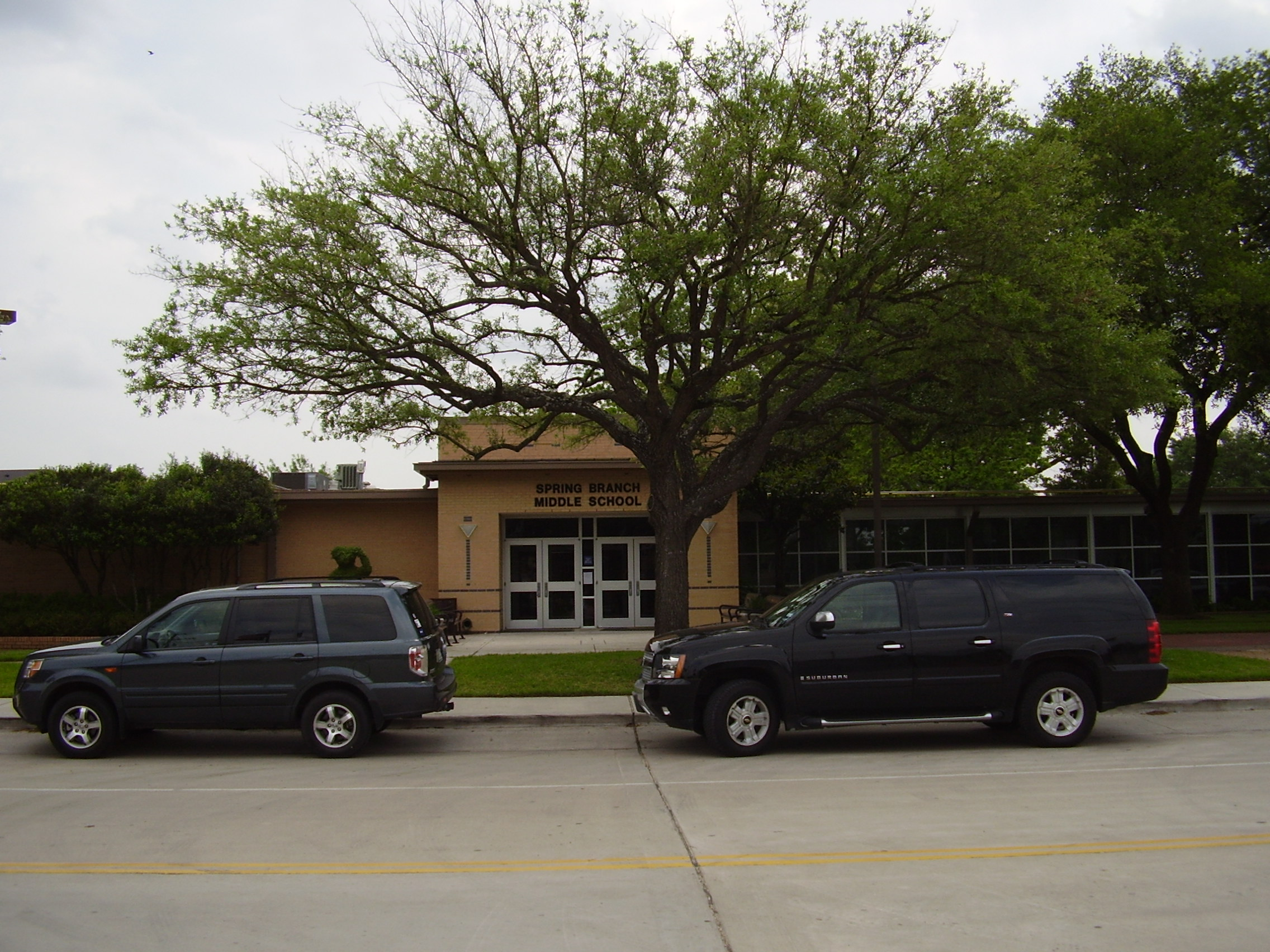
Spring Branch Middle School

==== Private schools ====
A Pre-K through 8th grade Catholic school called the St. Cecilia Catholic School, operated by the Roman Catholic Archdiocese of Houston is located in Hedwig Village. A nearby Kindergarten through 12th grade girls' Catholic school called the Duchesne Academy is located near Hedwig Village in Houston. Nearby, Holy Spirit Episcopal School offers placement for infants through 8th grade.

Other nearby private schools include The Kinkaid School and St. Francis Episcopal School, which are both located in the nearby Piney Point Village.

=== Public libraries ===
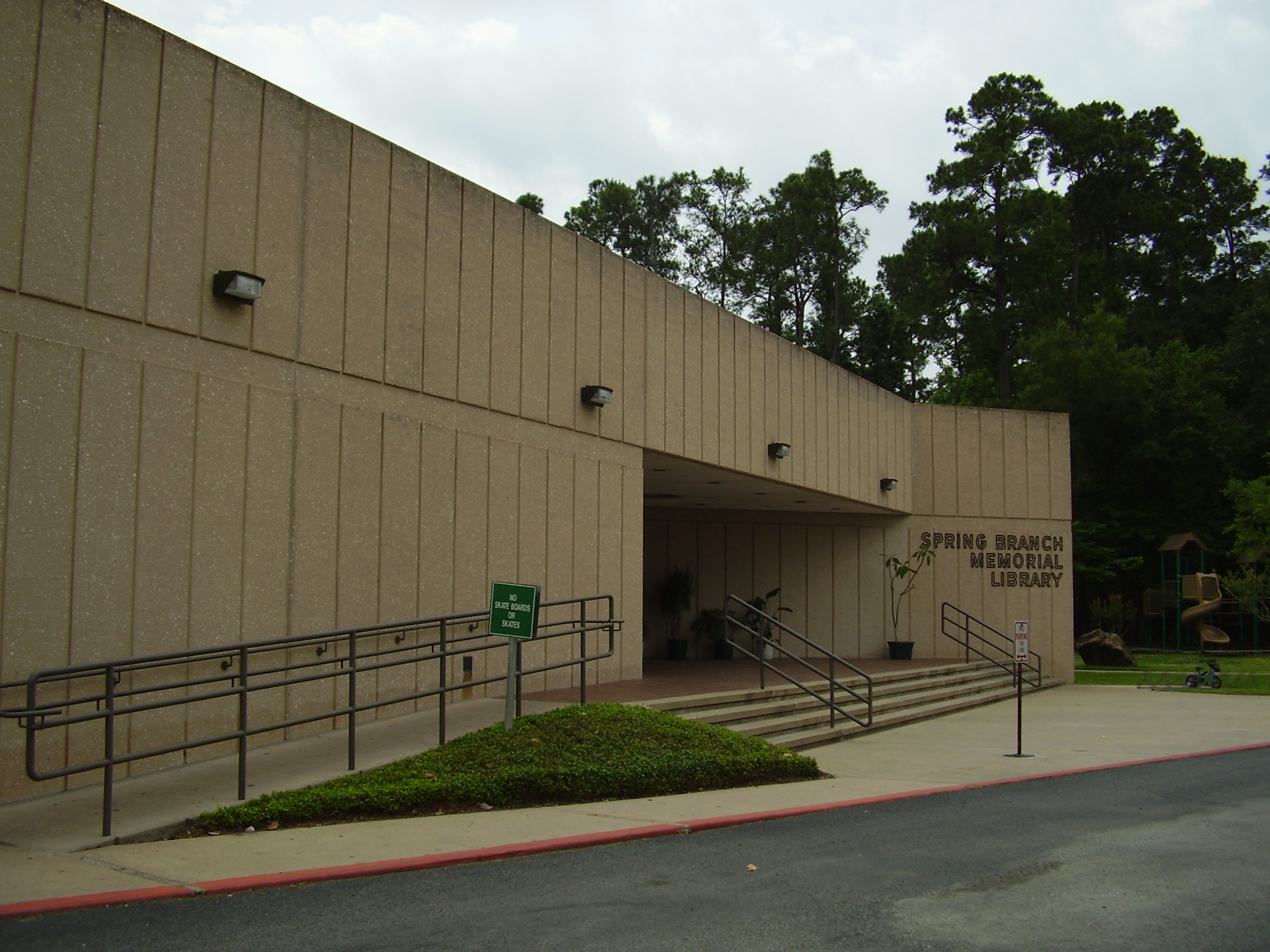
Spring Branch Memorial Library

The Harris County Public Library (HCPL) system operates the Spring Branch Memorial Branch at 930 Corbindale Road in Hedwig Village. The 10,500-square-foot (980 m^{2}) branch opened in 1975.

== Media ==
The Houston Chronicle is the area regional newspaper.

The Memorial Examiner is a local newspaper distributed in the community.

== Postal services ==
The United States Postal Service location serving 77024 is the Memorial Park Post Office at 10505 Town and Country Way, Houston, Texas, 77024-9998. This City of Hedwig Village is now officially recognized as a deliverable address. Residents and businesses can now use Hedwig Village, TX 77024 as an address line.
