= Westchester Academy for International Studies =

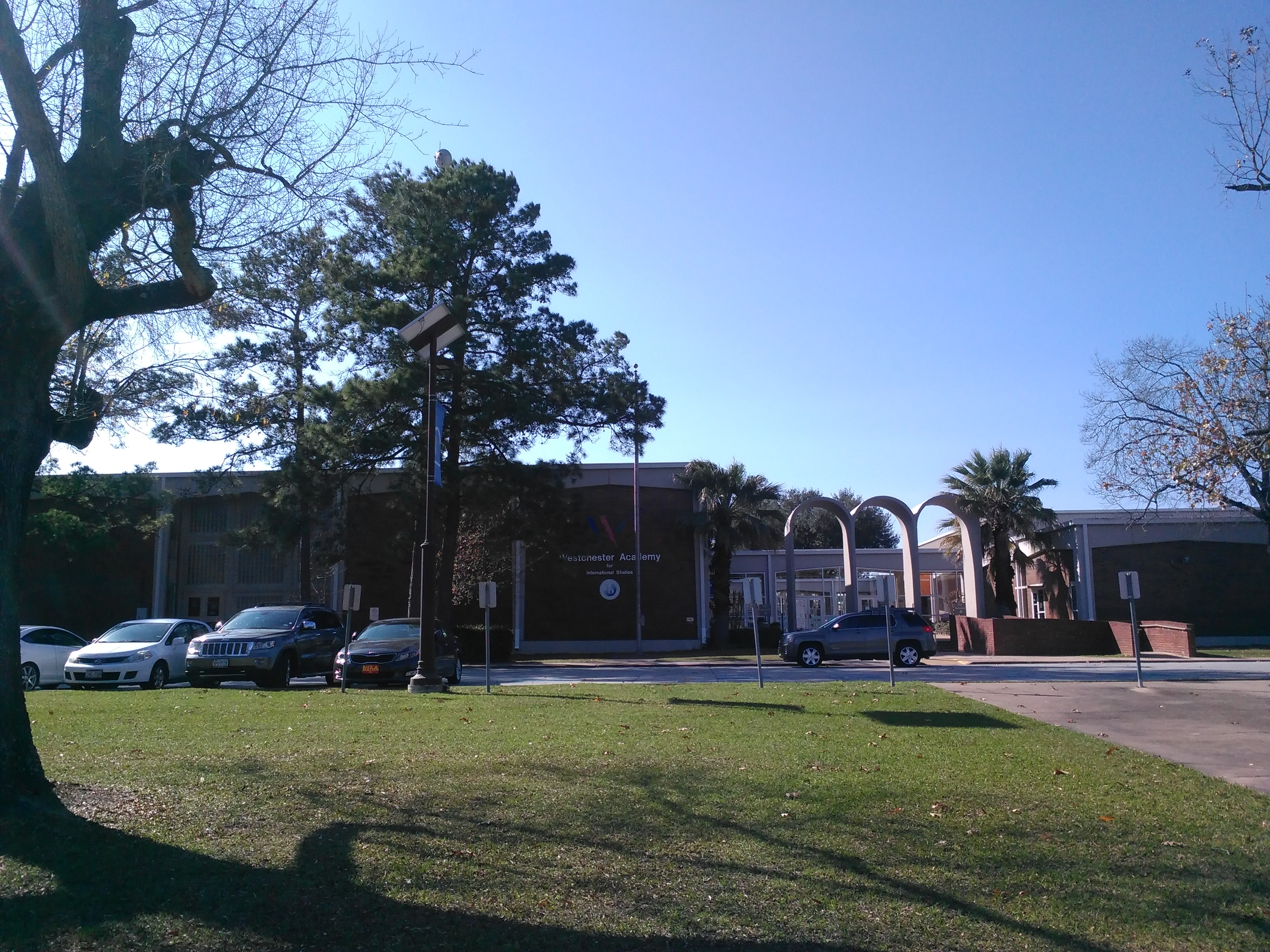

Location
- 901 Yorkchester, Houston, Texas; United States; 29.7808°N 95.5835°W

Information
- Established: 1967–1985; 1987–2000; 2001–present
- School district: Spring Branch Independent School District
- Dean: Alison Butler and Jesse Tachiquin
- Director: Bruce Hill
- Staff: 73.40 (FTE)
- Grades: 6–12
- Enrollment: 830 (2021-22)
- Student to teacher ratio: 13.15
- Color
- Mascot: Wildcat
- Yearbook: Miacis
- Website: wais.springbranchisd.com

The Westchester Academy for International Studies (WAIS) is a public charter school in the Spring Branch Independent School District in Houston, Texas. It serves grades 6–12 and is an International Baccalaureate continuum school, authorized for Middle Years, Career-related, and Diploma Programmes. As of 2026 Dr. Bruce Hill is the director.

== History ==
=== Westchester High School (1967–1985) ===
Due to the expanding enrollment of Memorial High School the school district built Westchester High School in 1967. The school opened with an enrollment of one thousand eight hundred students. After seven years the school had increased to nearly four thousand students. The campus could not support the numbers, and as such Stratford High School was built in close proximity to Westchester, opening in 1974.

Due to the oil bust in the early 1980s, the destruction of nearby apartment complexes, and many original home owners keeping their homes after their children had grown, enrollment in all SBISD high schools dropped dramatically. By 1985, the resulting decreases in enrollment forced the school board to close Westchester and relocate its former students to Memorial, Spring Woods and Stratford High Schools. Most Westchester students ended up attending Stratford High School, which for many years kept a permanent display case dedicated to Westchester memorabilia.

=== Westchester Campus of Houston Community College (1987–1999) ===
During a thirteen-year period the campus was leased to Houston Community College.

In 1987 about 30 students from SBISD and the Houston Independent School District gathered at Westchester High to study Japanese on every Saturday.

=== Westchester Academy for International Studies (1999–Present) ===
After this duration Spring Branch ISD made plans for the campus that resulted in a massive amount of construction and improvement on the pre-existing campus. In 1999 it reopened its doors as "Westchester Academy for International Studies". The school would eventually cap at one thousand students spanning across grades 6–12th. During the 2004–05 school year, the campus was shared with Stratford, due to renovations occurring on Stratford's campus. It is notable for being the only high school in Spring Branch ISD to offer the International Baccalaureate Diploma program at grades 11 and 12, an authorized Middle Years IB Program for grades 6–10, and has been recently authorized for the IB Career-related Programme. In 2014, Westchester was ranked in the top twenty-five high schools in Houston.

In Summer 2016, Jennifer Collier stepped down as Director to take the vacant Spring Woods principal position. Kathy Menotti was named Interim Director, with Kristin Nash accepting the position as assistant director of the middle school. On October 3, 2016, Kathy Menotti stepped down as interim director, and was replaced by Dr. Pamela Butler, who was the school's first director.Dr. Valerie Muniz (Now Hernandez) was chosen as the new permanent director of WAIS in May 2017. Kathy Menotti retired from her original position of assistant director of the Middle School in early 2017. Her replacement was chosen as Pamela Redd from Meadow Wood Elementary. Currently, the middle school director is Alison Butler, the high school director is Jesse Tachiquin, the IB Career Related Programme Coordinator is Sara Sebesta Camano, and the IB Diploma Programme Coordinator is Jacquelyn Phillips.

In Summer 2026, Valerie Hernandez stepped down as director and was replaced by Bruce Hill.

== Campus ==
The campus of WAIS is divided into several wings (A–E). The A Wing houses the middle school, foreign language department, and technology classes. The B Wing houses the auditorium, theatre department, cafeteria, choir department, main office, and the Director's Office. The C Wing house the wood gym and the dance room. The D Wing houses the rubber gym and storage areas. Lastly, the E Wing houses the upper school and the Upper School Administration office.

The WAIS campus is also home to the Southwest Transition Campus for elementary schools that are being rebuilt. The classes are housed in temporary buildings on the north side of the campus.

=== Altharetta Yeargin Art Museum ===
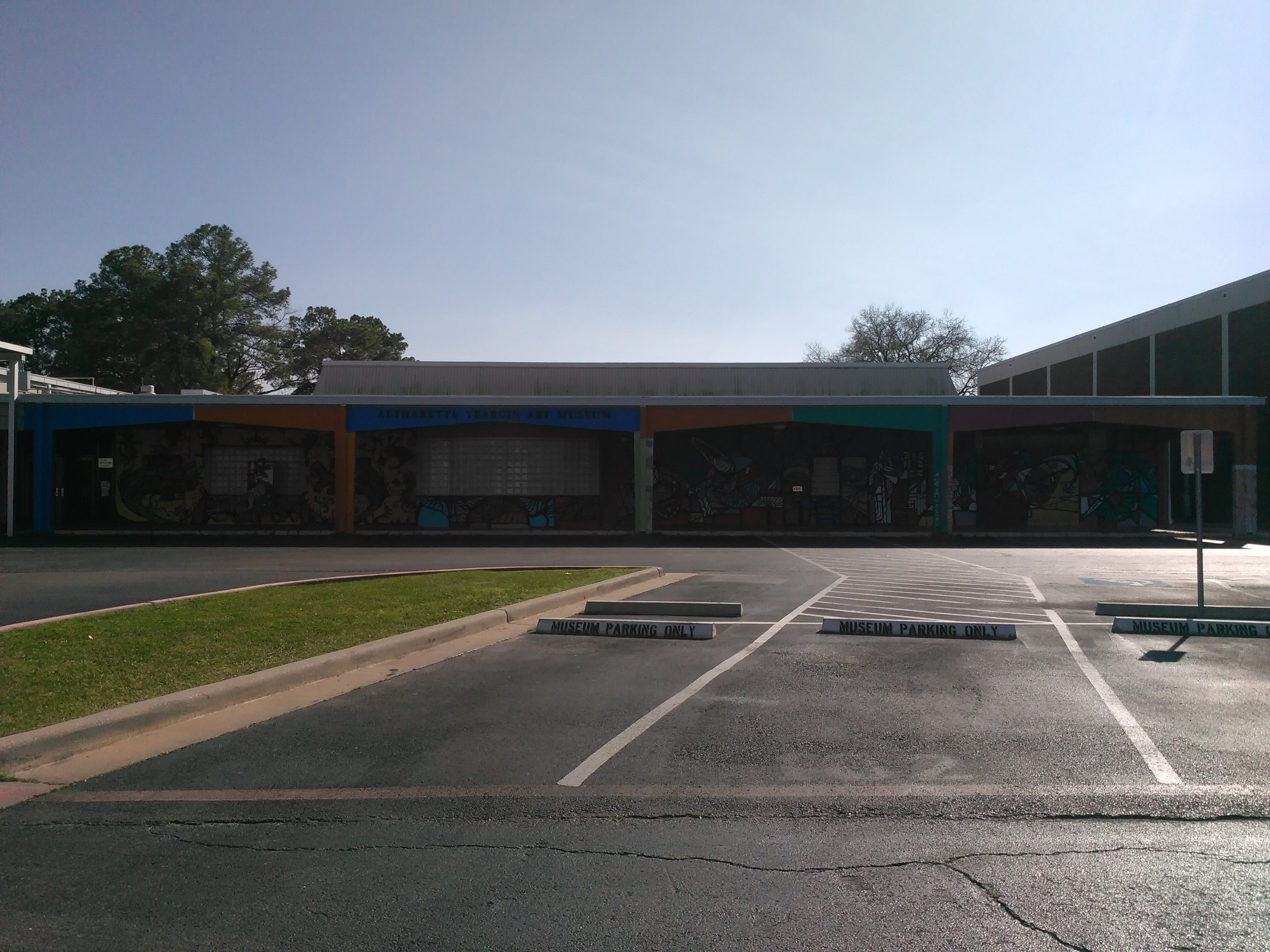
Altharetta Yeargin Art Museum

The Altharetta Yeargin Art Museum (AYAM) is an art museum funded by the Spring Branch Independent School District, the Spring Branch Education Foundation, and the First Junior Woman's Club of Houston, as well as through generous museum patrons . It is one of the only school districts in the nation that has an art museum. The museum is housed on the north side of the campus and is open to visitors by appointment.

== National Blue Ribbon School ==
WAIS was named a 2011 National Blue Ribbon School. It is one of only 304 schools nationwide to be honored for overall "academic excellence" and for success in closing student achievement gaps. Only 10 schools in Texas were named Blue Ribbon Schools in 2011.

== Weekend uses ==
The Japanese Language Supplementary School of Houston, a supplementary Japanese school operated by the Japanese Educational Institute (JEI), holds its classes at WAIS on Saturdays. It is for children between ages 5 and 18 who are Japanese speakers. As of 2015 the program is headed by Yoshihiko Saito (斎藤 義彦 Saitō Yoshihiko).

== Notable alumni ==
- Berkeley Breathed, Cartoonist
- David Clyde, Baseball
- Barbara Comstock, former Congresswoman for Virginia's 10th congressional district
- Robert Draper, Author, journalist, The New York Times, Rolling Stone
- Tilman Fertitta, Entrepreneur, Landry's, etc.
- Diane Pamela Wood, U.S. Court of Appeals judge
- Wes Anderson, Film director, (attended, graduated St. Johns)
- Scott Donie, Olympic diver, (attended, graduated in Miami, FL)
- Felicia Bond, American writer and illistrator

== Popular culture ==
In Reba, Reba's daughter attends Westchester High School. The school mascot is the Wildcats, and was filmed in the Wilchester subdivision.
