= Memorial, Houston =

Memorial
- Super neighborhood
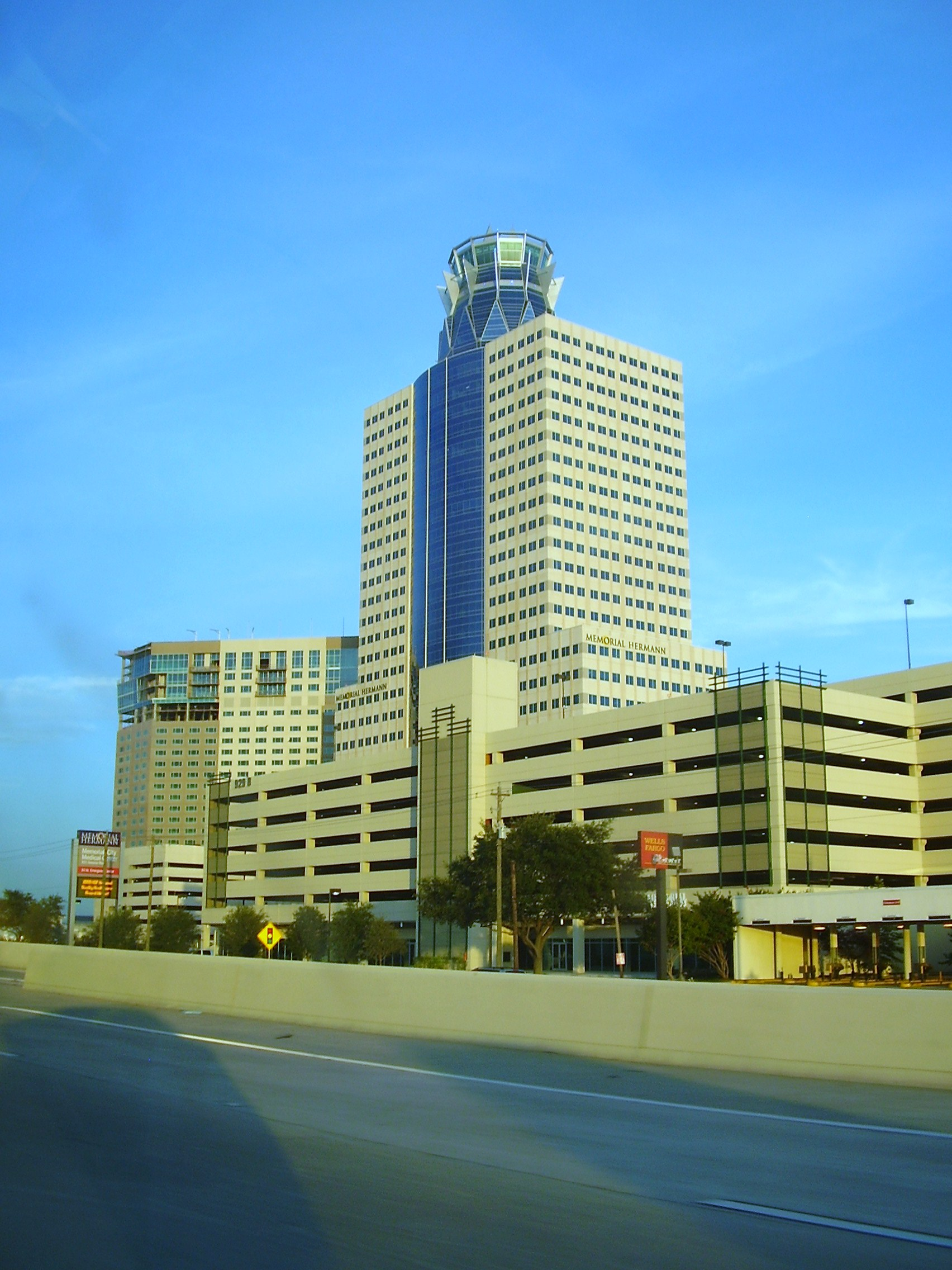
- Memorial Hermann Memorial City Medical Center along Interstate 10 in the Memorial City area.
- Interactive map of Memorial
- Coordinates: 29.7811°N 95.5459°W
- Country: United States
- State: Texas
- County: Harris County
- City: Houston

Area
  - Total: 10.75 sq mi (27.8 km^{2})

Population (2013)
  - Total: 44,413
  - Density: 4,131/sq mi (1,595/km^{2})
- Time zone: Central Time Zone (CT)
- ZIP codes: 77079, 77055, 77024
- Area codes: 281, 832, 713, 346
- Website: memorialsn.org

The Memorial area of Houston, Texas is located west of Downtown, northwest of Uptown, and south of Spring Branch. The Memorial Super Neighborhood, as defined by the City of Houston, is bounded by Buffalo Bayou to the south, Barker Reservoir to the west, Westview to the north, and the Memorial Villages (Spring Valley Village, Piney Point Village, Bunker Hill Village, Hedwig Village, Hilshire Village and Hunters Creek Village), a contiguous group of independent municipalities, to the east.

A rich variety of residential architectural styles, particularly mid-century modern, can be found in the affluent forested neighborhoods of Memorial along Buffalo Bayou. The area is also home to a number of major office and retail developments, including Memorial City, Town & Country Village, and CityCentre. A large portion of the Energy Corridor, a large business district heavily populated by energy-related firms, overlaps west Memorial along Eldridge Parkway and the Katy Freeway. Memorial takes its name from Memorial Drive, an east–west arterial road which bisects the area.

The area forms the western spine of the socioeconomic phenomenon known as the Houston Arrow, an area of increased affluence relative to the rest of the city.

== History ==
Prior to annexation by Houston, the Memorial area consisted of large country estates and farmland. In the mid-1940s, the town of Addicks relocated to the western edge of the area after the construction of Addicks Reservoir by the U.S. Army Corps of Engineers inundated the original townsite. This same flood control project, completed in the 1950s, created Barker Reservoir to the west of the area and channelized Buffalo Bayou from State Highway 6 to Beltway 8.

Houston gradually annexed Memorial between the 1950s and 1980s.

Rapid growth of the Houston metropolitan area in the 1960s led to the development of a number of subdivisions in the Memorial area, including Nottingham Forest, Westchester, and Fonn Villas. The Memorial Bend subdivision, first developed in 1955, is particularly notable for its large collection of mid-century modern houses. This development was accompanied by the reconstruction of U.S. Route 90 into Interstate 10. Retail development paralleled residential growth; Memorial City Mall was established in 1962, followed by Town & Country Village in 1965.

Residents of Memorial Bend opposed the construction of Texas State Highway Beltway 8 through their neighborhood during the project's planning stages in the early 1960s, but an alternative western route along Dairy Ashford Road was deemed too costly. Funding issues delayed the construction of Beltway 8 through Memorial until the late 1980s.

Memorial continued to gain population between 1980 and 1990.

From 1999 to 2003, Memorial City Mall underwent a $600 million renovation. The mall and neighboring Memorial Hermann Memorial City Medical Center now anchor a large mixed-use district featuring multiple office towers, hotels, and apartments. Nearby Town and Country Mall, constructed in the 1980s, was razed in 2005 and replaced with CityCentre, a walkable mixed-use district.

=== Hurricane Harvey ===
In August and September 2017, portions of Memorial adjacent to Buffalo Bayou and its tributaries experienced severe flooding from record rainfall associated with Hurricane Harvey. Critical water levels in Addicks Reservoir to the north and Barker Reservoir to the west of the district forced the U.S. Army Corps of Engineers to amplify the release of floodwaters downstream into Buffalo Bayou well beyond normal levels, inundating low-lying neighborhoods near Terry Hershey Park and in the Memorial Villages. Controlled reservoir releases and associated flooding were expected to last for up to two weeks after the passage of the storm.

Buffalo Bayou's record-high level throughout Memorial rendered multiple major thoroughfares impassable, including Texas State Highway 6 and portions of Interstate 10; the sunken stretch of the Sam Houston Tollway near CityCentre was submerged for a week, causing significant damage to the roadway. Inundated homes in Memorial were subject to a mandatory evacuation, and the entire area was subject to an emergency curfew even after the expiration of the citywide curfew.

== Government and infrastructure ==
=== Local government ===
In the 1990s, Memorial, along with River Oaks and Tanglewood, was described as one of Houston's "richest, most Republican neighborhoods." In the first 1991 Mayor of Houston election, Bob Lanier received more votes than any other candidate in Memorial.

=== County, state, and federal representation ===
Harris County Precinct Three, represented by Steve Radack, includes Memorial.

Memorial is part of Texas Senate Districts 7, 15 and 17, with the largest part in District 7. In the Texas House of Representatives, Memorial is included in Districts 132, 133, 136 and 138.

Memorial is in Texas's 7th congressional district, represented by Democrat Lizzie Pannill Fletcher.

Harris Health System (formerly Harris County Hospital District) designated Northwest Health Center for ZIP code 77024. The nearest public hospital is Ben Taub General Hospital in the Texas Medical Center.

=== Services ===
The United States Postal Service operates the Memorial Park Post Office at near Memorial City, serving ZIP code 77024. Of more recent construction is the Fleetwood Post Office, serving 77079.

== Demographics ==
In 2015, the City of Houston-defined Memorial Super Neighborhood had 47,604 residents. 67% were non-Hispanic white, 14% were Hispanic, 11% were non-Hispanic Asian, 5% were non-Hispanic black, and 3% were non-Hispanic other. In 2000 the super neighborhood had 44,957 residents. 78% were non-Hispanic white, 10% were non-Hispanic Asians, 9% were Hispanics, and 2% each were non-Hispanic blacks and others.

== Education ==
=== Primary and secondary schools ===
Most of Memorial is zoned to Spring Branch Independent School District (SBISD). The Houston Independent School District does not serve residents in Memorial. Students in the western end of the Memorial area attend Katy Independent School District schools. The area is generally known for the high quality of its public schools.

In 2015, residents of the Katy ISD segments of Thornwood, in the Memorial area, attempted to leave Katy ISD and join Spring Branch ISD, citing long commutes to Katy schools. The Spring Branch ISD board denied their request.

==== Public schools ====
For pre-kindergarten all residents in Spring Branch ISD are assigned to the Wildcat Way School in Memorial. Zoned elementary schools in the Memorial area in Houston include Meadow Wood, Nottingham, Rummel Creek, Thornwood, Wilchester. In addition, sections are, in separate attendance zones, served by Bunker Hill Elementary School and Frostwood Elementary School in the City of Bunker Hill Village, as well as Memorial Drive Elementary School in City of Piney Point Village. The district also operates Bendwood Elementary School, serving gifted/talented students in the SPIRAL program in grades 3 through 5 as well as utilizing the Preschool Program for Children with Disabilities for special needs students.

Major middle schools in Memorial include Memorial Middle School and Spring Forest Middle School. In addition, Spring Branch Middle School, in the City of Hedwig Village, serves sections of Memorial.

Memorial High School in Hedwig Village serves the eastern portion of the Memorial area, while Stratford High School in Memorial serves the western portion of the Memorial area. Westchester Academy for International Studies is a Spring Branch ISD district-wide charter magnet school serving grades 6-12.

==== Private schools ====
Memorial Private High School, a private 6-12 school, is located in Memorial near Spring Forest Middle School.

Private schools in the surrounding area:

- Saint John XXIII High School (formerly Pope John XXIII High School) in western Harris County, within Greater Katy, is in proximity to Memorial.
- As of 2019 The Village School in the Energy Corridor area has a bus service to Memorial.
- As of 2017 Awty International School in Spring Branch, which has the Houston area's French international school, maintains a bus service to Memorial.

=== Public libraries ===
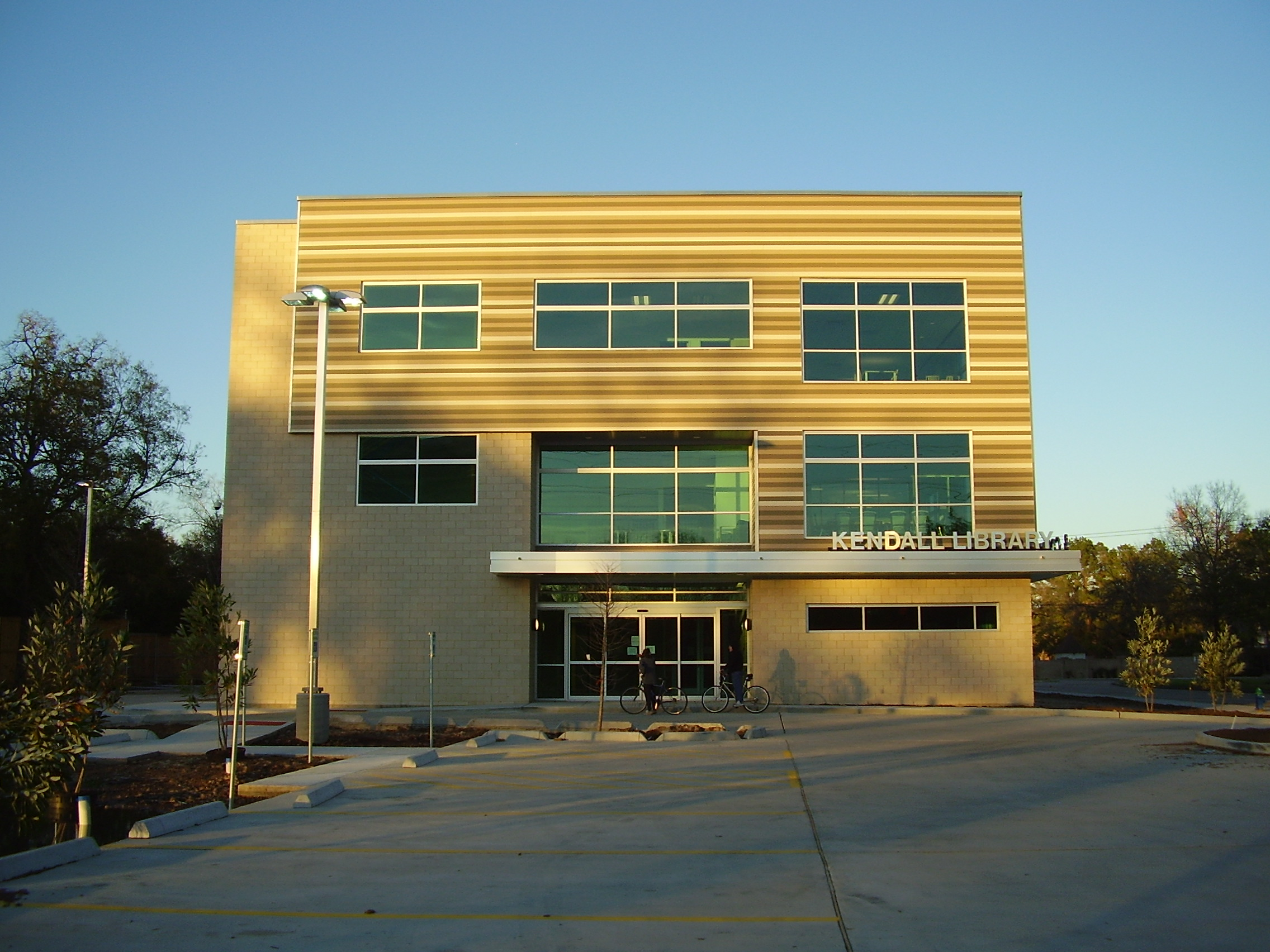
Kendall Library

Memorial is served by the Kendall Library of Houston Public Library (HPL), located on Eldridge Parkway, and the Spring Branch Memorial Branch of Harris County Public Library, in Hedwig Village.

Of all HPL branches the Kendall Library received the most severe damage during Hurricane Harvey in 2017; the damage, which affected the electronic system and elevator, but not most of the books as the majority were on the library's second floor, included mold and was so severe that HPL employees re-entered the branch several days after the flood. The total level of water ranged from 4.5 feet (1.4 m) to 5 feet (1.5 m). The library afterward enacted a $4 million project post-Harvey renovation program with a tentative 2019 opening.

=== Colleges and universities ===
Houston Community College System (HCC) serves Spring Branch ISD and Katy ISD along with other school districts.

== Parks ==
The western two-thirds of Memorial is bordered to the south by Terry Hershey Park, a linear park which straddles the Buffalo Bayou between Barker Reservoir and Beltway 8. The park is named for local conservationist Terry Hershey, who founded the Bayou Preservation Association to prevent the Memorial section of the bayou from being lined with concrete. Today, the park is a popular destination for running and bicycling.

Other public parks located within Memorial include Bendwood Park, adjacent to Town and Country Village, and Nottingham Park, near Tully Stadium.

Another park near Memorial, Houston is Memorial Park. It's near I-10 West and the 610 South Loop. It is named one of the largest urban parks in Texas and in the United States. The park offers a 3-mile running track, tennis courts, a golf course and playgrounds. There are also various other trails to take you to lakes, ponds, and other peaceful settings.

== Media ==
- The Memorial Buzz, one of four magazines produced by The Buzz Magazines, is a monthly publication about people, products and services in the community. It is mailed free of charge to all residents the first week of each month.
- The Houston Chronicle is Houston's primary newspaper.
  - The Memorial Examiner is a community newspaper owned by Hearst and operated as a subsidiary of the Chronicle.

== Neighborhoods ==
=== Energy Corridor ===
The Energy Corridor is an energy industry-oriented business district which overlaps with western Memorial. Within Memorial, the district generally runs parallel to Interstate 10 between Highway 6 and Kirkwood Road, and extends south of Buffalo Bayou along Eldridge Parkway.

The entire district, which extends westward into Greater Katy, contains over 300 companies which employ 94,000 people. One of the Energy Corridor's largest employers, BP America, is headquartered in the Memorial area at Westlake Park.

=== Memorial Bend ===
As of 2004 Memorial Bend had about 350 houses, with the majority being Mid-Century Modern and ranch houses; many were built in the late 1950s and early 1960s. That year five were recently built and therefore had different designs. The community is near Town & Country Village.

=== Nottingham Forest ===
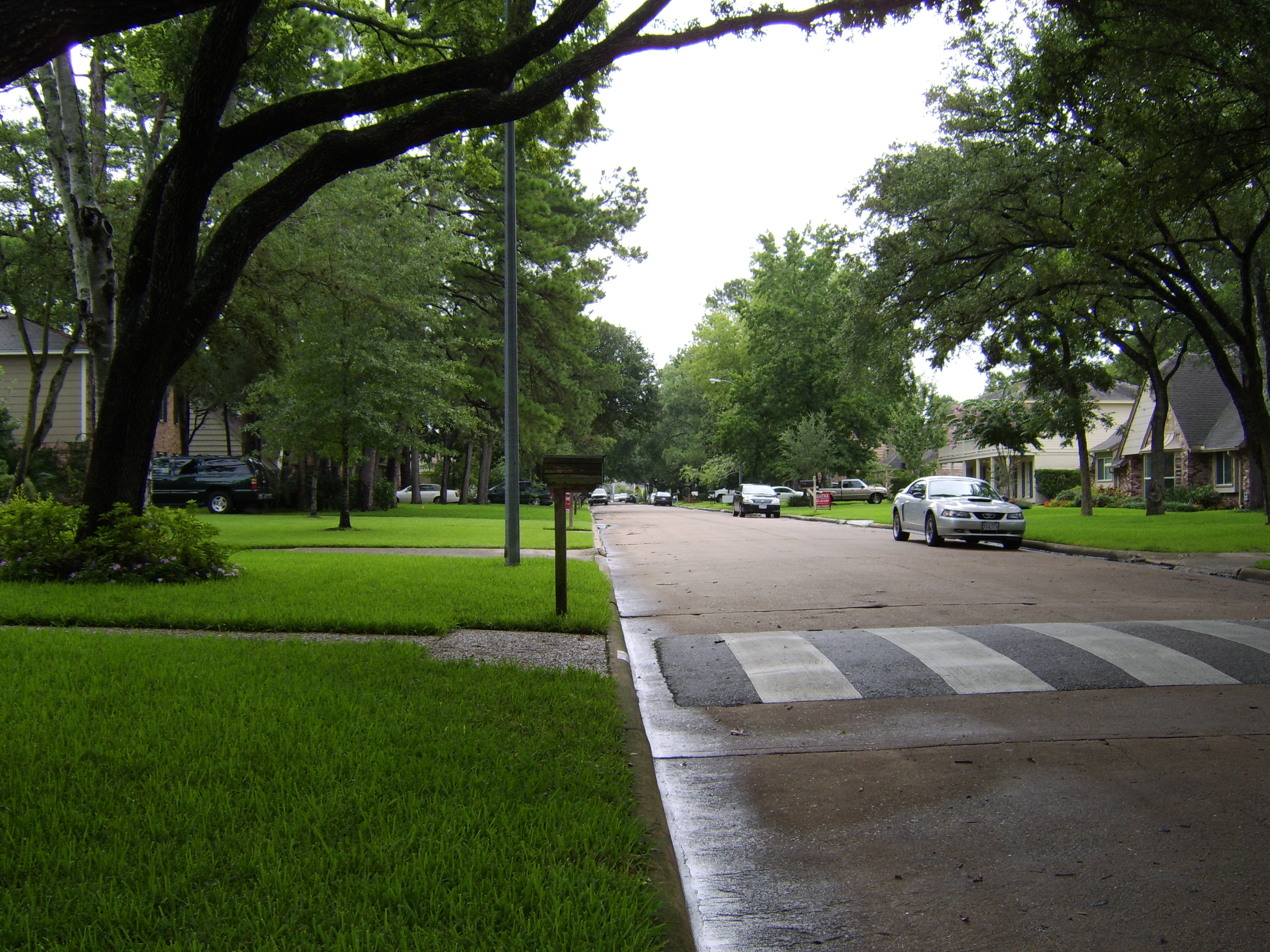
Looking east on Chadbourne Drive in Nottingham Forest, Section 8

Nottingham Forest (29°46′1.95″N 95°36′54.16″W and 29°45′59.3346″N 95°35′52.512″W) is a group of subdivisions bordered by Memorial Drive to the north and the Buffalo Bayou to the south and west. The neighborhood was one of the first areas of far west Memorial to be developed in the 1960s.

Nottingham Forest was the childhood home of comedian Bill Hicks. Hicks jokingly referred to the neighborhood as a "strict Southern Baptist ozone".

== Notable residents ==
- Jeff Bagwell, retired first baseman for the Houston Astros
- Michael Glyn Brown, former hand surgeon
- Jose Camarena and Judy Camarena, founder of Taqueria Arandas and his daughter, now manager of the entire company
- Roger Clemens, retired MLB pitcher who played for the Houston Astros (Memorial Buzz Magazine)
- Darryl Hamilton, former MLB outfielder
- Bill Hicks, standup comedian - Spent his childhood in Memorial
- Andy Pettitte, retired MLB pitcher who played for the Houston Astros
- Mary Lou Retton, retired American gymnast
- J. J. Watt, NFL defensive end for the Houston Texans
- Andrew Luck, NFL QB for the Indianapolis Colts, attended Stratford High School
