= Houston Arrow =

Section of the western half of Houston, Texas

The Houston Arrow is a socioeconomic and political phenomenon observed in the western half of the US city of Houston, Texas and several inner suburbs. Its name refers to the fact that it takes the shape of an arrow when mapped out. The arrow begins around the Addicks and Barker reservoirs, and runs south of Interstate 10 and north of the Westpark Tollway before ending in a triangle near Downtown Houston.

The arrow tends to be most visible on maps showing inequality in Houston, as neighborhoods within it are wealthier and more educated than surrounding neighborhoods and receive better city services. It also has a much larger white population than the rest of the city. While most of Houston leans towards the Democratic Party, the arrow is much more politically conservative, with many voters backing Republican candidates. However, following with nationwide trends of educated suburban areas towards the Democrats, the area has seen large political shifts in recent years, with places like Bellaire backing Joe Biden in 2020.

The arrow contains many of the Houston region's most prosperous neighborhoods and enclave cities. The arrow began to see development in the 1920s, when Houston's wealthy elites began to settle in the area. They excluded non-white residents, as well as Jews, from living in neighborhoods like River Oaks. The wealth and political connections of the arrow's residents allowed them influence over Houston's development; for instance, while highway development greatly disrupted Houston's majority-black neighborhoods, significant concessions and changes were granted at the request of property owners within the arrow. The arrow expanded as formerly impoverished and declining areas such as the Washington Corridor underwent gentrification in the late 20th and early 21st centuries.

== Component neighborhoods and cities ==
- Downtown
- The Heights
- Garden Oaks
- Oak Forest
- Lazybrook
- Timbergrove
- Old Sixth Ward
- Neartown (Montrose)
- Midtown
- River Oaks
- West University Place
- Southside Place
- Bellaire
- Meyerland
- Westbury
- Memorial
- The Memorial Villages (Spring Valley Village, Piney Point Village, Bunker Hill Village, Hedwig Village, Hilshire Village and Hunters Creek Village)
