= Memorial City, Houston =

Coordinates: 29.786°N 95.545°W

Memorial City
- District
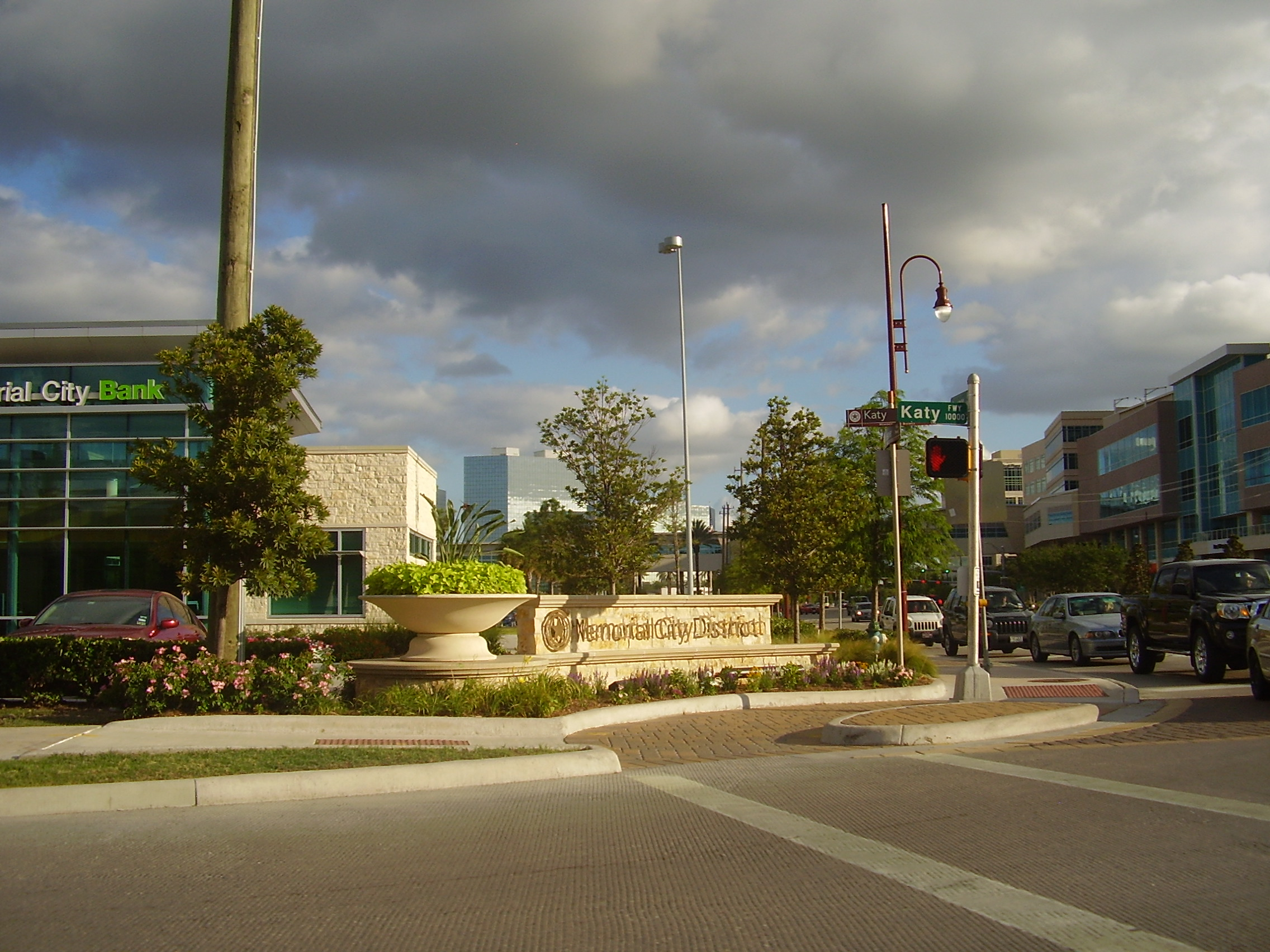
- Memorial City sign
- Etymology: Memorial, Houston
- Interactive map of Memorial City
- Country: United States
- State: Texas
- County: Harris County
- City: Houston
- District created: 1999

Area
  - Total: 850 acres (340 ha)

Population
  - Total: 4,422
  - Density: 3,300/sq mi (1,300/km^{2})
- ZIP Code: 77024, 77055
- Website: www.memorialdistrict.org

Memorial City is a commercial district in the Memorial area of Houston, Texas, United States. Located along Interstate 10 (Katy Freeway) between Beltway 8 and Bunker Hill Road, the district is anchored by Memorial City Mall, the nation's 38th-largest shopping mall; Memorial Hermann Memorial City Medical Center; CityCentre, a high-density mixed-use development; and Town & Country Village, a shopping center. Large portions of Memorial City are owned by development firm MetroNational, which has developed 265 acres (107 hectares) in the area, including the entirety of the mall.

Memorial City is a significant regional employment center with over 6.1 million square feet (570,000 m^{2}) of retail and 8.3 million square feet (770,000 m^{2}) of office space. The district's businesses employ over 47,000 people. Memorial City Mall attracts approximately 20 million visitors per year. The district's growing residential population houses over 4,400 people, largely concentrated in a series of high-density apartment complexes.

A portion of Memorial City is serviced by the Memorial City Management District, a special governmental district which provides branding and infrastructure funding. The management district was created by the Texas Legislature in 1999.

== History ==
Memorial City Mall—then known as Memorial City Shopping Center—was opened in August 1966 with 42 stores, including the 1,400-seat Memorial Theatre. The mall's opening catalyzed development in its immediate vicinity, with the construction of new apartments and the first portions of the neighboring hospital complex through the late 1960s. By the early 1970s, the Memorial area was one of the fastest-growing regions in Houston, with the Spring Branch Independent School District adding roughly 4,000 new students per year.

Accompanying the rapid growth of the area, Memorial City Mall underwent dramatic changes in the 1970s. In August 1973, a third major anchor store, Montgomery Ward, joined the original two (Sears and Weingarten's). The following year, the mall nearly doubled in size with the addition of a new eastern wing, adding 40 stores including a Foley's, its third major department store. By the mid-1970s, Memorial City Mall boasted over 1.25 million square feet (116,000 m^{2}) of retail space hosting 126 merchants and 6,500 parking spaces. A fourth expansion was completed in 1977.

The area's rapid growth generated enough demand for a second major shopping center, and in February 1983, Town & Country Mall opened at the southeastern corner of Interstate 10 and Beltway 8 with 90 stores. Town & Country quickly grew to 150 stores by 1985, with four lead tenants: Neiman Marcus, Marshall Field's, Joske's, and J. C. Penney. Shortly after its successful debut, a reconstruction project along Interstate 10 commenced, followed by the construction of the Sam Houston Tollway adjacent to the property. By 1986, long-term closures on Interstate 10 depressed visitor numbers so severely that 39 tenants shuttered and retail sales reached an all-time low. Town & Country's developers threatened to sue state and local highway officials, but in 1988, an agreement was reached to adjust the construction schedule. Compounding the mall's struggle to attract shoppers was the onset of the 1980s oil glut, which resulted in a severe local recession in Houston.

Memorial City Plaza, a 1-million-square-foot (93,000 m^{2}), three-building office complex immediately south of Memorial City Mall, was developed in the early 1980s at a cost of $66 million ($258 million in 2017 dollars). In 1988, Loews Cineplex Entertainment announced it would open a new eight-screen theater at Memorial City Mall after the closure of Memorial Theatre earlier in the decade. The addition of the new movie theater and other entertainment options, such as a roller-skating rink and an arcade, helped Memorial City weather the early 1990s recession. The Memorial City Loews would shutter in 2001, following the company's bankruptcy filing in February; Loews claimed the theater was "underperforming".

Town & Country Mall continued to decline through the 1990s, despite the completion of the Beltway 8 project. The new stack interchange at the intersection of Beltway 8 and Interstate 10 obscured the development, which did not have direct access to the Katy Freeway frontage roads. The tollway was described by the Houston Chronicle as a "big concrete moat" blocking access to the property. In 1995, the mall's developers, JMB Realty, defaulted on the development's $33 million mortgage, which was subsequently purchased by American General. By this point, large portions of the mall—including the entirety of the third floor—were vacant.

The Texas Legislature created the Memorial City Management District in 1999. That same year, the city of Houston proposed the creation of a new Tax Increment Reinvestment Zone (TIRZ) for Memorial City. TIRZs levy incremental taxes on commercial properties to fund new infrastructure within their boundaries. The Memorial City TIRZ, which was proposed to fund new roadway infrastructure and potential office and residential development around the mall, faced strong backlash from Memorial-area residents who expressed skepticism of developer MetroNational's intentions and fear of the traffic congestion new development would bring to the area. A June 1999 area mobility plan accompanying the TIRZ proposal included controversial suggestions to extend roads through existing park space. Ultimately, with the support of mayor Lee P. Brown, the TIRZ was approved by Houston City Council in July 1999 despite a visible and contentious campaign by over 1,200 area residents. City councilmembers, justifying their support of the tax district, expressed their concern about flooding and economic decline in Memorial City.

In 1999, a proposed redevelopment of the mall by management firm Taubman Centers—which would have introduced high-end retailers Nordstrom, Lord & Taylor, and Neiman Marcus—was scrapped, with Taubman Centers exiting out of a 55-year management deal it had brokered with MetroNational in 1996. MetroNational devised its own redevelopment plan for the property, beginning with the construction of a new Foley's in 2000. The $100 million redevelopment project, which renovated the entirety of the mall, was completed in 2003, expanding the mall to 1.9 million square feet (180,000 m^{2})—the second-largest in Houston, behind The Galleria—and adding retailers Target and Dillard's. A 16-screen Cinemark movie theater opened in 2007, ending the mall's six-year run without a movie theater. After the renovations, retail rents at Memorial City doubled from $200 per square foot to over $400.

Meanwhile, Town & Country's malaise continued into the early 2000s as American General attempted to sell the property. The mall lost most of its major tenants with the departure of Saks Fifth Avenue in 2000 and Dillard's in 2002. Town & Country's demise was in spite of an otherwise strong retail environment in west Houston at the time, with the full-scale renovation of Memorial City to the east and the reconstruction of high-end Town and Country Village to the south. In 2004, the property was sold to developer Midway Companies, which immediately announced Town & Country's demolition. In 2007, Midway announced a new $500 million mixed-use development on the 37-acre (15-hectare) site, CityCentre, which was designed to reduce automobile dependency by combining high-density office, retail, and residential components in a pedestrian-oriented urban space. The first phase of the CityCentre project was completed in 2009. In 2014, Midway announced CityCentre's second phase, featuring 740,000 square feet (69,000 m^{2}) of office space in two 16-story office towers and a 13-story apartment building on 6 acres (2.4 hectares) of land fronting Interstate 10. In contrast to Town & Country Mall, CityCentre has been successful, reaching 90% retail occupancy in 2015.

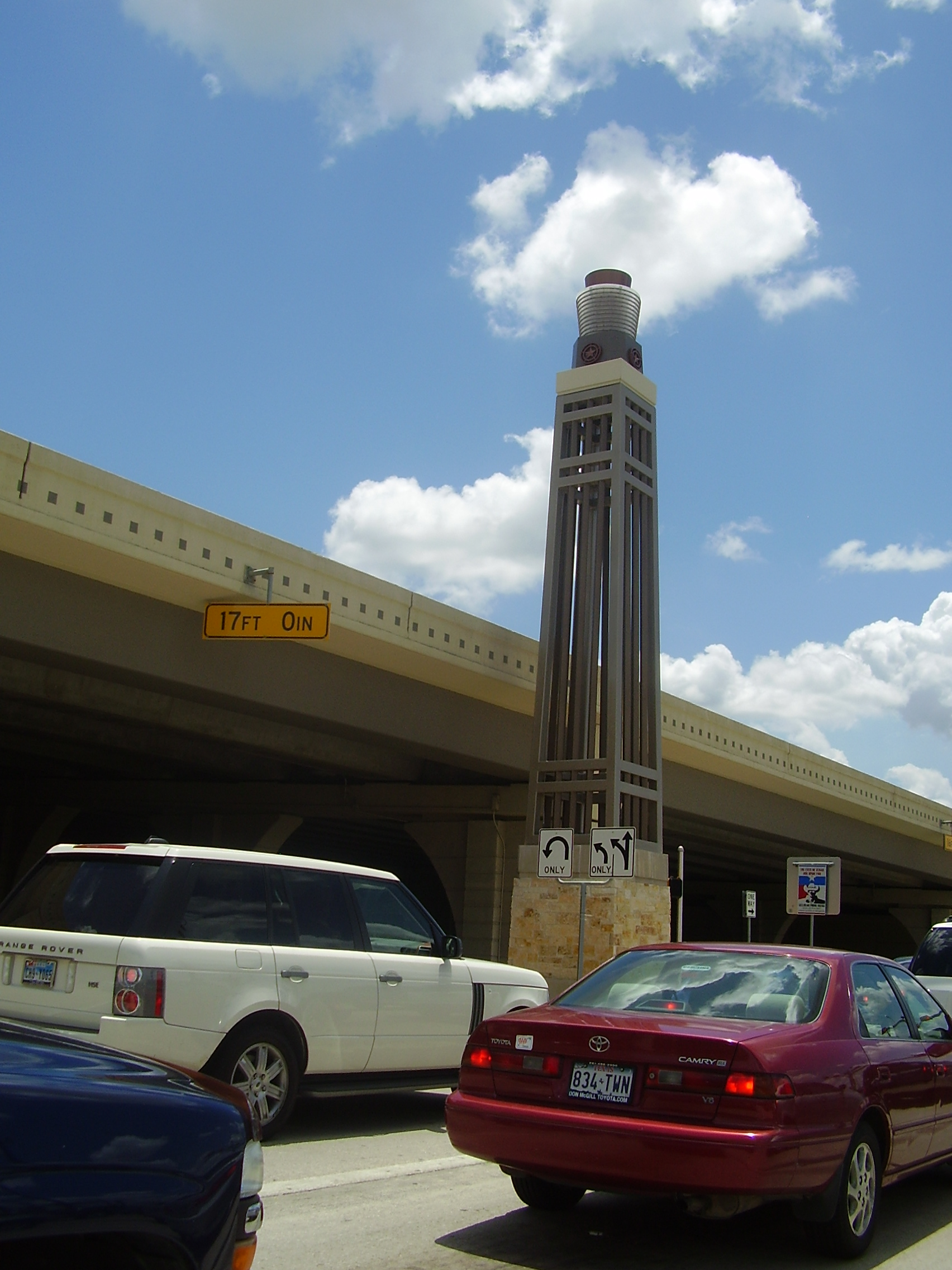
A five-story obelisk installed along Interstate 10 in 2009

Following the expansion of Memorial City Mall, MetroNational began developing large tracts of land along Interstate 10 in the late 2000s and early 2010s. To the west, Memorial Hermann expanded with the addition of a 33-story office tower, architecturally notable for its "futuristic crown," a Westin hotel, new professional buildings, and a retail center dubbed "The Gateway". To the east, a large tract between the mall and Bunker Hill Road was gradually filled with high-rise office, hotel, and residential developments, including the U.S. headquarters of Air Liquide. In 2017, Memorial City expanded north of Interstate 10 for the first time with the construction of the U.S. headquarters of Cemex. The district has also attempted to brand itself with the construction of four five-story obelisks with lighted tops along Interstate 10.

== Cityscape ==
The district straddles Interstate 10 (the Katy Freeway) between Beltway 8 and Bunker Hill Road. While consisting mainly of retail, medical and office complexes, the district includes four apartment complexes with a combined total of 988 units. One, the Terrace at Memorial City, is only for senior citizens. The Villas at Bunker Hill is located north of the Memorial Management District district boundary at the southwest corner of Bunker Hill and Pine Lake Drive.

As is the case in several of the special management districts of Houston, Memorial Management District uses street name signage of a different graphic design style and color scheme than the standard white-on-green signs used in many neighborhoods throughout the city.

== Economy ==
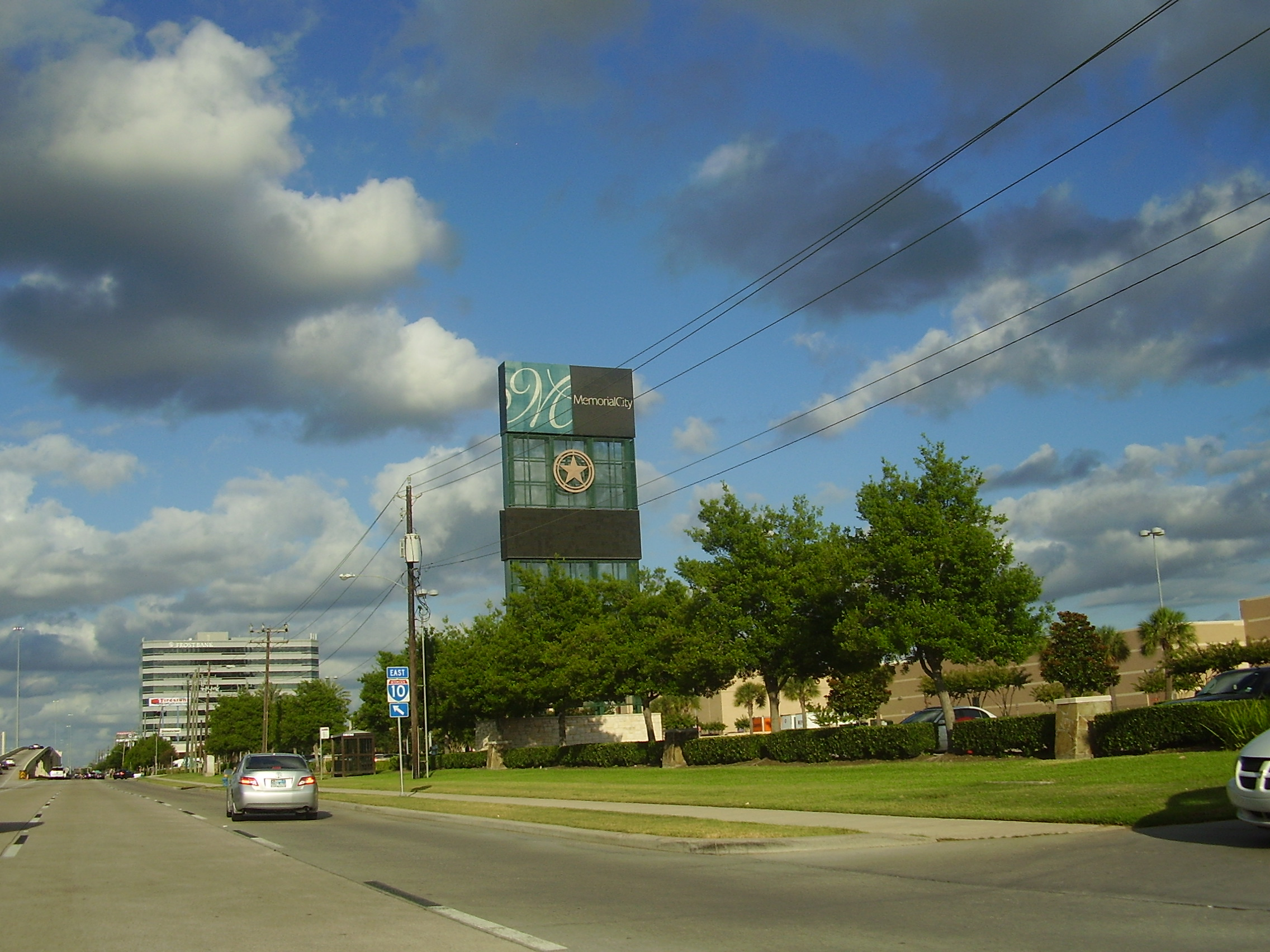
Memorial City Mall

Many of Memorial City's employees live and work within a 10-mile (16 km) radius of the intersection of Interstate 10 and Gessner Road, covering portions of suburban Harris County and Fort Bend County. The three largest employers include Memorial City Mall, with 5,000 local employees, the Chase Bank Service Center, with 1,100 local employees, and the CEMEX United States operations, with 1,000 local employees.

There are 24 retail centers in the district which each have more than 10,000 square feet (930 m^{2}) of space, making a total of 3,620,000 square feet (336,000 m^{2}) of space. The Memorial City Mall has over half of the retail space in the district, with 1,900,000 square feet (180,000 m^{2}) of space. There were no gross retail sales figures for the Memorial City area that were available from public published sources, so the district used the publication the average sales per square foot statistics for shopping centers in the Southern United States stated in the publication "Dollars & Cents of Shopping Centers/The SCORE 2006." To calculate sales of single tenant big box stores, the district used average national sales data for specific stores. Using the data the district estimated that its annual retail sales were $1.1 billion in 2006 dollars, making an average of about $300 per square foot.

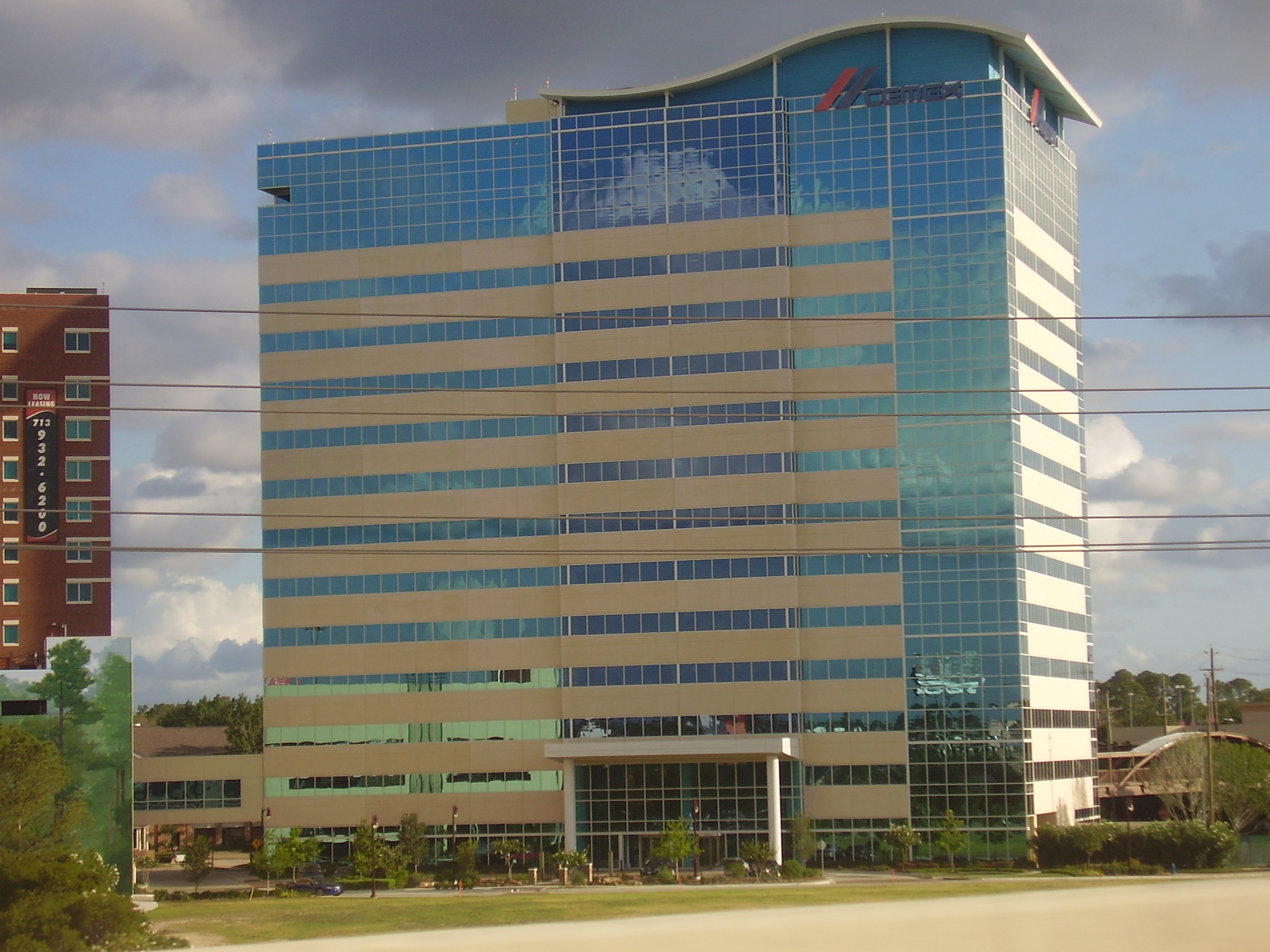
Cemex offices

There are 20 office buildings with a total of 2,900,000 square feet (270,000 m^{2}) of space. Most of the buildings are multi-tenant, while some, such as the Chase Service Center, each have a single tenant. 11 distribution, industrial, and warehouse facilities in Memorial City have a total of about 700,000 square feet (65,000 m^{2}) of space. Three hotels, the Candlewood Suites ‐ Houston‐Town and Country, the Four Points by Sheraton Houston, Memorial City (formerly the Radisson Suites Hotel West) and the Westin Houston Memorial City are located in the district. The Westin, with 250 rooms, is located between the Memorial City Mall and the Memorial City Hospital. 75 residential units are on the top floors of the hotel.

Group 1 Automotive has its corporate headquarters in One Memorial City Plaza. Dow Chemical operates a purchasing office in Suite 600 at Two Memorial City Plaza. The office, which opened on 1990, has operations involving co-product marketing, energy and hydrocarbons purchasing, optimization and pipeline activities, and polypropylene commercial and corporate auditing. Sumitomo Corporation operates its Houston Office in Suite 1000 in Three Memorial City Plaza at 840 Gessner Road. Industries supported by the office include Chemicals, Plastics, and Tubular Products.

== Demographics ==
A 2006 demographic projection stated that 4,324 people lived within the district. The population lived in 1,756 households. Of the population, 2,371 (54.8%) were Hispanic, 1,529 (35.4%) were non-Hispanic White, 283 (6.5%) were Asian, 72 (1.7%) were African-American, and 11 (0.3%) were Native American. There were no Pacific Islanders living in Memorial City. 2,878 residents were over 24 years of age.

The same demographic projection stated that 1,388,425 people lived within the 10 miles (16 km) "commute zone." The population lived in 535,249 households. Of the commute zone population, 513,362 (37%) were non-Hispanic White, 493,336 (35.5%) were Hispanic, 231,020 (16.6%) were African-American, 121,876 (8.8%) were Asian, 25,189 (1.8%) were Other, 2767 (0.2%) were Native American, and 874 (0.1%) were Pacific Islander. 894,500 were over 24 years of age.

== Government and infrastructure ==
Memorial City Management District is headquartered in Suite 1530 in Two Memorial City Plaza.

Parts of Memorial City are within Houston City Council District G, and parts are in city council District A.

The United States Postal Service operates the Memorial Park Post Office at 10505 Town and Country Way in Memorial City.

== Education ==
=== Higher education ===
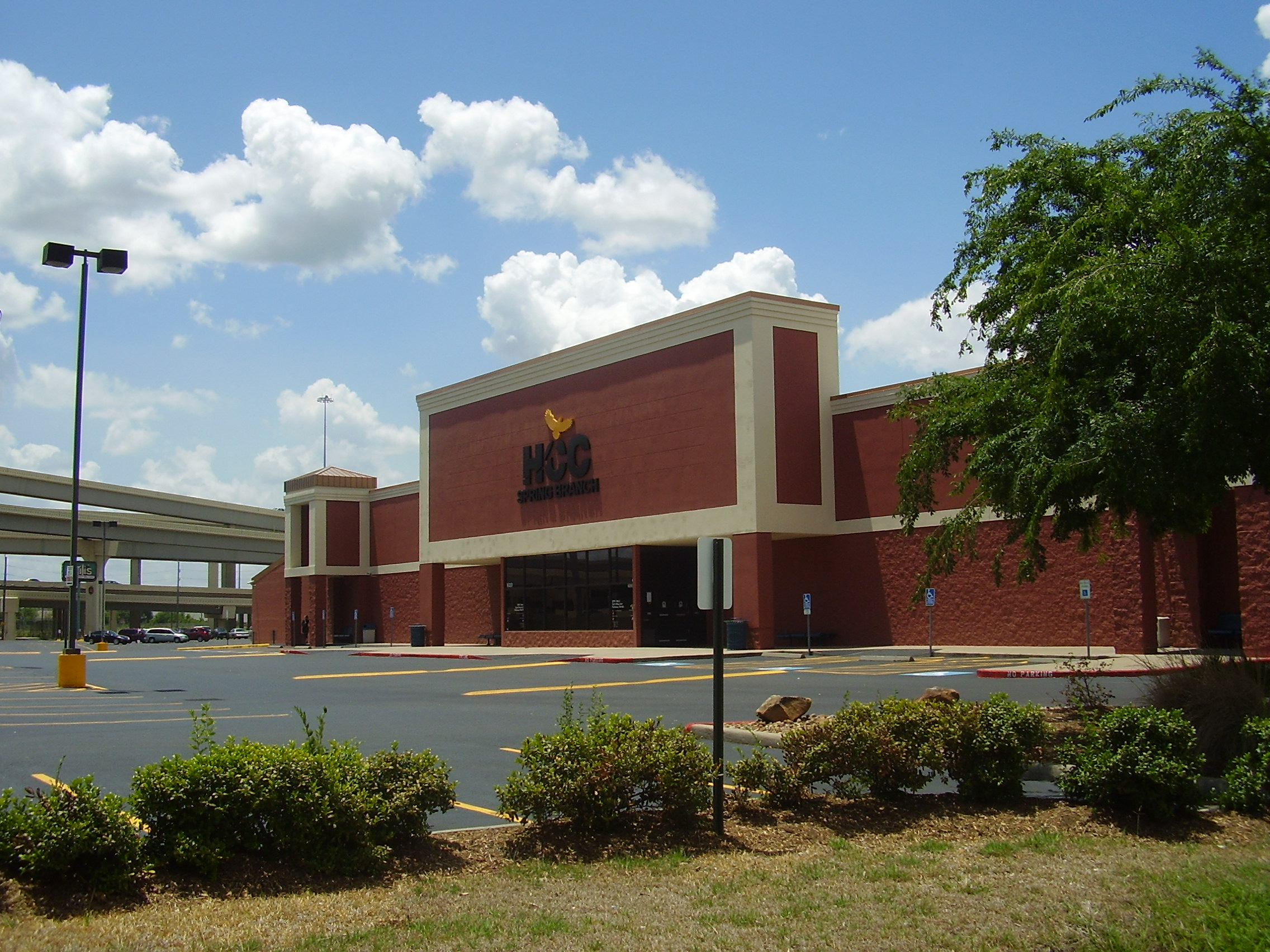
Houston Community College Spring Branch in Memorial City

Houston Community College (HCC) operates the Spring Branch Campus (formerly the Town and Country Campus), a part of the Northwest College. The campus is in Memorial City, at the northeast corner of Beltway 8 and Interstate 10. The facility was known as the Town and Country Campus until 2009. The college is inside the former Town and Country Mall. In 1999 a former 112,000-square-foot (10,400 m^{2}) AMC Theatres and KMart building in Town and Country was re-tenanted to HCC. HCC signed its lease to occupy portions of the Town & Country Square Shopping Center in 1999. During that year the owners of the Town & Country Square Shopping Center filed a lawsuit against HCC for trying to stop a Barnes & Noble from opening in the shopping center premises.

Other colleges and universities within the commute zone include other HCC campuses and Houston Baptist University.

=== Primary and secondary schools ===
The residential space within Memorial City is within the Spring Branch Independent School District.

Residents south of Interstate 10 are zoned to Wildcat Way School in Houston for preschool. Residents north of Interstate 10 are zoned to Tiger Trail School. Three elementary schools, Bunker Hill Elementary School in the City of Bunker Hill Village, Frostwood Elementary School in the City of Bunker Hill Village, and Shadow Oaks Elementary School in Houston serve sections of Memorial City. Residents north of I-10 are zoned to Spring Oaks Middle School in Houston, while residents south of I-10 are zoned to Memorial Middle School in Houston. Residents south of I-10 are zoned to Memorial High School in the City of Hedwig Village while residents north of I-10 are zoned to Spring Woods High School in Houston.

=== Adult educational attainment statistics ===
A 2006 demographic projection said that of the 2,878 Memorial City residents over 24 years of age, 522 (18.2%) had less than a 9th grade education, 383 (13.3%) had some high school education but did not possess a high school diploma, 582 (20.2%) had graduated from high school or received a GED, 515 (17.9%) attended college but did not have a degree, 104 (3.6%) had an associate degree, 520 (18.1%) had a bachelor's degree, 158 (5.5%) had a master's degree, 67 (2.3%) had a professional school degree, and 27 (0.9%) had a doctorate degree.

The same projection said that of the residents of the 894,500 Memorial City commute zone over 24 years of age, 91,249 (10.2%) had less than a 9th grade education, 94,688 (10.6%) had some high school education but did not possess a high school diploma, 160,757 (18%) had graduated from high school or received a GED, 184,495 (20.6%) attended college but did not have a degree, 43,150 (4.8%) had an associate degree, 207,704 (23.2%) had a bachelor's degree, 67,755 (7.6%) had a master's degree, 30,984 (3.5%) had a professional school degree, and 13,718 (1.5%) had a doctorate degree.

== Health care ==
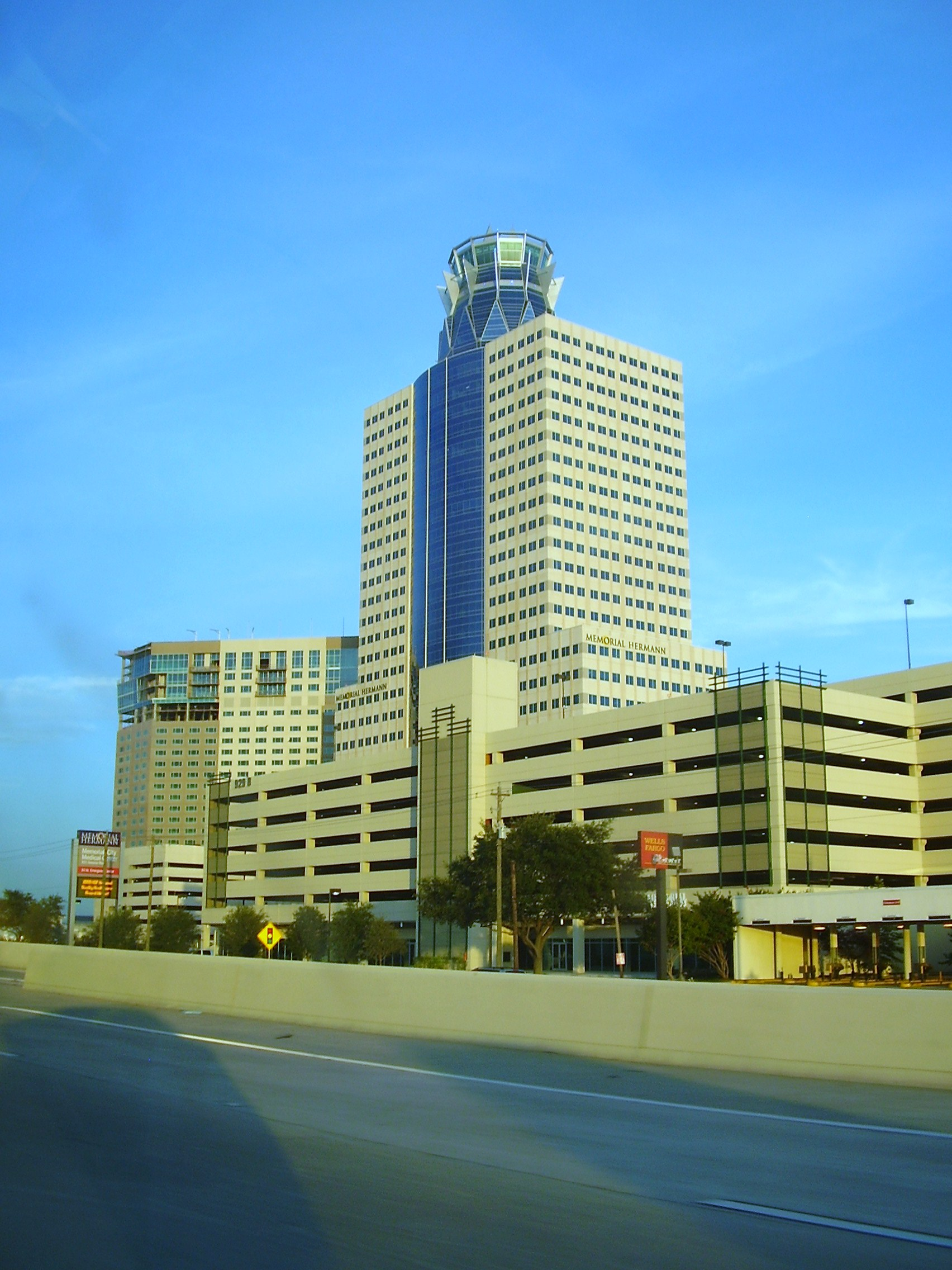
Memorial Hermann Memorial City Medical Center

The Memorial Hermann Memorial City Medical Center opened in 1971 as Memorial City General Hospital, taking its current name in 1988. It has 527 beds and cares for over 25,000 patients per year.

== Transportation ==
Interstate 10 (Katy Freeway) bisects the Memorial City district and provides east-west access. Beltway 8 provides major regional north-south access. Gessner Road provides additional north-south access.

Metropolitan Transit Authority of Harris County, Texas provides public transportation. The 72 Westview route connects Memorial City with Spring Branch. The 70 Memorial route connects Memorial City to Northwest Transit Center. via Memorial Drive; this allows people living in other parts of Houston to transfer in Downtown to the 160,161 and 162 routes servicing Memorial City. The 160 Memorial City Express connects Memorial City to Downtown via Northwest Transit Center.The 161 Wilcrest Express connects Memorial City to Downtown and Wilcrest Drive, the 162 Memorial Express connects Memorial City to Downtown the western Memorial Drive area. The 46 Gessner route connects Memorial City to Spring Branch, Westchase, and Sharpstown via Gessner Road. The 39 Katy Freeway route connects Britoak Lane to Northwest Transit Center via the Katy Freeway service road. The 26 Long Point/ Cavalcade, which terminates here alongside the 160, connects to the Hempstead Transit Center and Kashmere Transit Center via Long Point Road and Cavalcade Street.
