= List of tallest hospitals =

This is a list of tallest hospitals, showing all hospital buildings with an architectural height of at least 120 metres (390 ft) worldwide that are either completed or structurally topped-out as of October 2025.

#	Building	Hospital	City	Country/Territory	Height metres / feet	Floors	Built
1	Hospital Angeles Andares	Hospital Angeles	Zapopan	Mexico	179.11 metres (587.0 ft)	31	2025
2	Memorial Hermann Tower	Memorial Hermann Memorial City Medical Center	Houston	United States	165.20 metres (542.0 ft)	33	2009
3	Methodist Outpatient Care Center	Houston Methodist Hospital	Houston	United States	156.06 metres (512.0 ft)	26	2010
4	Centennial Tower	Houston Methodist Hospital	Houston	United States	155.80 metres (511.2 ft)	26	2027
5	Changzheng Hospital	Naval Medical University	Shanghai	China	152.80 metres (501.3 ft)	37	2019
6	Tower Wing	Guy's Hospital	London	United Kingdom	148.65 metres (487.7 ft)	34	1974
7	Li Shu Pui Block	Hong Kong Sanatorium & Hospital	Hong Kong	Hong Kong	148.50 metres (487.2 ft)	38	2008
8	The O'Quinn Medical Tower	Baylor St. Luke's Medical Center	Houston	United States	145.25 metres (476.5 ft)	29	1990
9	Wuhan Xiehe Hospital Tower	Wuhan Xiehe Hospital	Wuhan	China	144.78 metres (475.0 ft)	32	2006
10	Bhumisirimangkhlanusorn Building	King Chulalongkorn Memorial Hospital	Bangkok	Thailand	142.00 metres (465.88 ft)	29	2013
11	Lester & Sue Smith Legacy Tower	Texas Children's Hospital	Houston	United States	139.29 metres (457.0 ft)	25	2013
12	Central Orthopedic Medical Center Building	Central Orthopedic Medical Center	Wuhan	China	138.90 metres (455.7 ft)	31	2016
13	Block K	Queen Mary Hospital	Hong Kong	Hong Kong	137.00 metres (449.48 ft)	27	1991
14	Tower A Outpatient Cancer Care	Memorial Sloan Kettering Cancer Center	New York City	United States	136.25 metres (447.0 ft)	24	2019
15	Medipol Mega University Hospital Tower	Istanbul Medipol University	Istanbul	Turkey	136.00 metres (446.19 ft)	33	2021
16	New Building	Abdali Medical Center	Amman	Jordan	135.00 metres (442.91 ft)	36	2019
17	Ann & Robert H. Lurie Children's Hospital of Chicago	Lurie Children's Hospital	Chicago	United States	134.77 metres (442.2 ft)	24	2012
18	New Building	Hospital Sírio-Libanês	São Paulo	Brazil	133.80 metres (439.0 ft)	27	2015
19	Hospital Angeles Valle Oriente	Hospital Angeles Monterrey	Monterrey	Mexico	133.00 metres (436.35 ft)	28	2006
20	Shirley Ryan AbilityLab	Shirley Ryan AbilityLab	Chicago	United States	131.40 metres (431.1 ft)	27	2016
21	Memorial Hermann Medical Plaza	Memorial Hermann Memorial City Medical Center	Houston	United States	131.04 metres (429.9 ft)	28	2007
22	Elegance Medical Tower	King Fahd Medical City	Riyadh	Saudi Arabia	130.00 metres (426.51 ft)	27	2016
23	M&D Tower	Memorial Sloan Kettering Cancer Center	New York City	United States	129.24 metres (424.0 ft)	25	2006
24	Tokyo Medical and Dental University	Tokyo Medical and Dental University	Tokyo	Japan	125.95 metres (413.2 ft)	26	2009
25	Galter Pavilion	Northwestern Memorial Hospital	Chicago	United States	122.68 metres (402.5 ft)	22	1997
26	Main Building	Tungs' Taichung MetroHarbor Hospital	Taichung	Taiwan	120.09 metres (394.0 ft)	26	2008
27	Herlev Hospital	University of Copenhagen	Herlev	Denmark	120.00 metres (393.70 ft)	25	1976
28	Southwest Hospital Surgery Tower	Army Medical University	Chongqing	China	120.00 metres (393.70 ft)	25	2003
29	Octavio Frias de Oliveira Tower	Instituto do Câncer de São Paulo	São Paulo	Brazil	120.00 metres (393.70 ft)	23	2008

== See also ==
- History of hospitals
- List of hospitals by capacity
- List of hospitals by staff
- List of tallest buildings in the world
- List of the oldest hospitals in the United States
