= Barons Group =

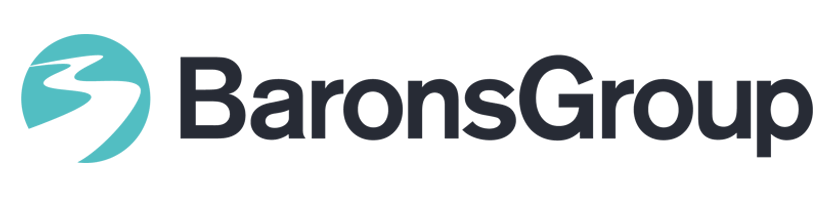
- Trade name: Group 1 Automotive UK ltd
- Company type: Subsidiary
- Industry: Automotive retail
- Founded: 2007
- Successor: Group 1 Automotive
- Headquarters: United States
- Number of locations: 70 dealerships
- Area served: United Kingdom
- Brands: Various automotive brands via retail, including Audi, BMW, MINI & Ford
- Parent: Group 1 Automotive.
- Website: https://baronsgroup.co.uk https://www.group1auto.co.uk/

The Barons Group is a collection of car and van dealerships owned by Group 1 Automotive.

The network is made up of over 70 new and used dealerships, and collision centres located across London, Anglia and South East England. Barons Group offers a range of lifestyle and luxury franchises.

== History ==
In March 2007, Group 1 Automotive launched their UK operation - the Barons Group. The Barons Group was founded when Group 1 Automotive acquired their first BMW and MINI Dealerships based in Brighton, Hailsham and Worthing.

Essex Audi became part of the Barons Group in May 2012 when Group 1 Automotive acquired their first UK Audi dealerships. Made up of six Audi dealerships, Essex Audi is based in Chelmsford, Chingford, Colchester, Harold Wood, Stansted, Southend and surrounding areas.

In February 2013, Think Ford was founded. Originally part of Inchcape, the Farnborough, Guildford, Wokingham and Bracknell Ford Centres were acquired by Group 1 Automotive and became part of the Barons Group, and the Think Ford name was born.

In December 2014 Elms BMW and MINI were acquired to join the UK Barons Group network.

February 2016 saw Spire Automotive become part of Group 1 Automotive's subsidiary, the Barons Group, representing Audi, BMW, MINI, Volkswagen Commercial, SEAT and SKODA across Hertfordshire, London and Essex.

The Beadles Group was acquired by Group 1 Automotive in June 2017 to join their UK operation of Barons Group. Founded in 1987, the Beadles Group is based in Dartford, United Kingdom. Beadles represents Jaguar, Land Rover, Volkswagen, Kia, SKODA, Vauxhall and Toyota across Kent, Surrey, Essex and Hertfordshire.

In March 2018, the Barons Group acquired five Mercedes-Benz and three smart dealerships. Originally part of the Robinsons Motor Group, the Mercedes-Benz centres are based in Norwich, Peterborough, Cambridge, Bury St Edmunds and King's Lynn, with smart dealers situated in Cambridge, Norwich and Peterborough.

As of the 12th of January 2019 Barons Group has been rebranded under Group 1 Automotive.

== Operations ==
As of June 2018, the Group 1 Automotive subsidiary Barons Group operates a UK network of 70 car and van dealerships.

The UK operation represents a wide range of vehicle manufacturers including premium brands such as Audi, BMW, Jaguar, Land Rover and Mercedes-Benz.

As well as premium brands, the Barons Group also represents lifestyle brands such as Ford, Kia, Toyota, ŠKODA, SEAT and Volkswagen.
