= Bunker Hill Elementary School =

Bunker Hill Elementary School can refer to several schools in the United States, including:

- Bunker Hill Elementary School in Indianapolis, Indiana
- Bunker Hill Elementary School in unincorporated Coos County, Oregon
- Bunker Hill Elementary School in Bunker Hill Village, Texas
- Bunker Hill Elementary School in Washington, D.C.; listed on the National Register of Historic Places
- Bunker Hill Elementary School in unincorporated Berkeley County, West Virginia
