= William L. Thaxton Jr. House =

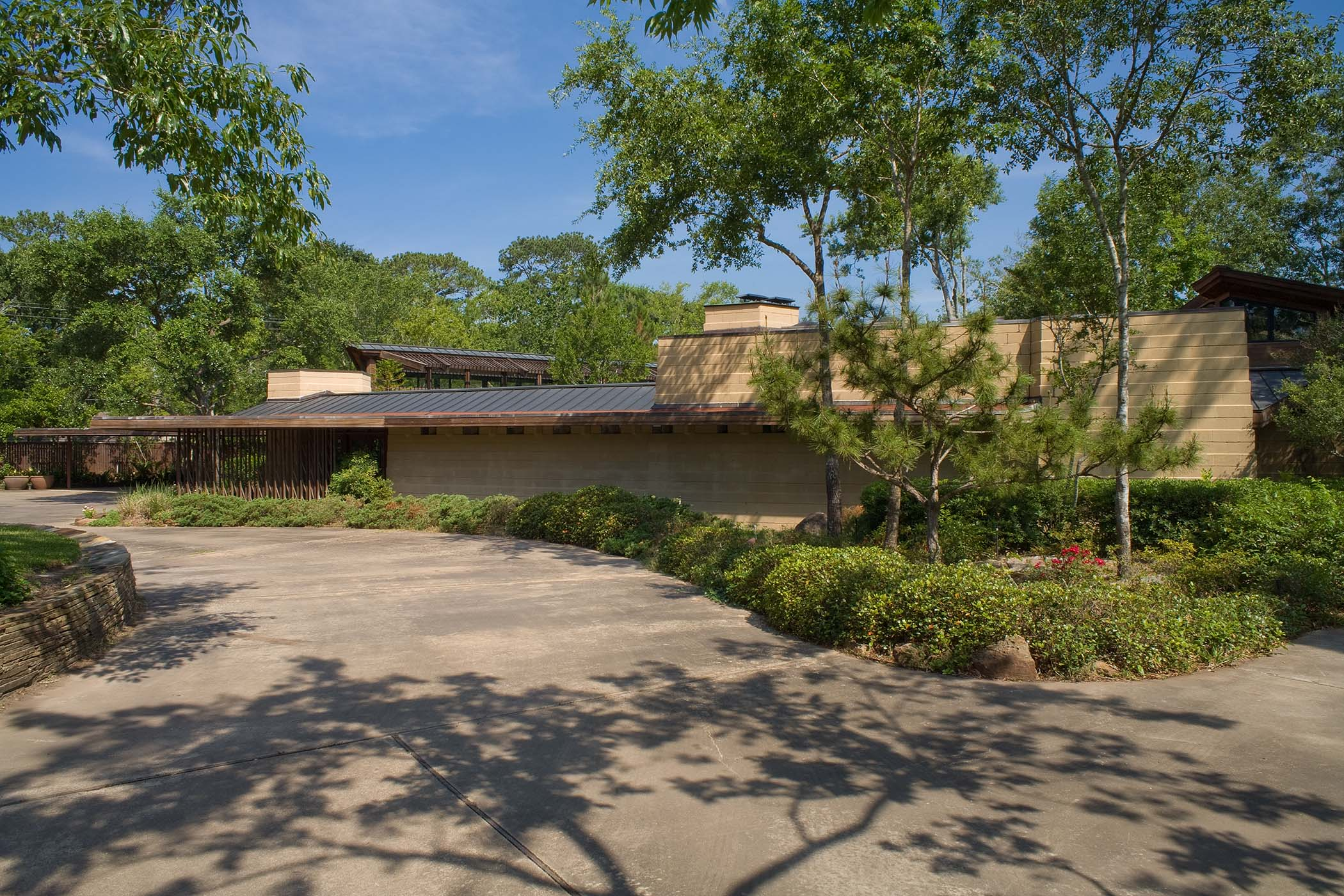

- Location within Texas

General information
- Type: House
- Architectural style: Usonian
- Location: Bunker Hill Village, Texas
- Coordinates: 29.767399°N 95.539643°W
- Construction started: 1954

Design and construction
- Architect: Frank Lloyd Wright

The William L. Thaxton Jr. House is a large single-story Usonian house, designed by Frank Lloyd Wright in 1954 and built in Houston, Texas in 1955. The Thaxton House is Wright's only residential project in Houston. Thaxton was a successful insurance executive and commissioned Wright to design a work of art that would also be suitable for living and entertaining.

While 1954 is noted as the date of the Thaxton House design, as documented by author Paul V. Turner in his book "Frank Lloyd Wright and San Francisco", the floor plan and basic form of this house was created by Wright four years earlier in 1950, for different clients and a different site (the Bush House, for Stanford professor Robert N. Bush and his wife, sited on the Stanford University campus in Palo Alto, CA). According to Turner, the design was "resurrected and executed, with few changes for the Thaxton House". The earlier Bush House floor plan shown in Turner's book indeed looks almost identical to the published Thaxton House floorplan. While not common, Frank Lloyd Wright -- and the Wright Fellowship after his death -- did on several occasions take the opportunity to recycle an unbuilt design for an earlier location and client.

This Usonian is one of Wright's smaller designs at 1,800 square feet and is designed as a parallelogram and constructed of concrete block. Wright designed the house around a "diamond module" with 60- and 120-degree angles. The red cement floors had a diamond pattern in the same shape. The skylights were equilateral triangles, each corner 60 degrees. The pool, nestled into the wide corner of the L-shaped house, was a parallelogram with a notch out of one corner. Other interesting facets of the house include a long screened in patio (the roof of the patio is a screen as well, not a roof), a swimming pool only a few feet from the master bedroom door, an unusually shaped built-in bed in the master bedroom and triangle-shaped recessed lighting bays.

As he often did, Wright designed all the furniture himself, with most of it anchored to the walls, so the homeowners couldn't even rearrange it. He drew parallelogram bunk beds and a bed for the tiny, prow-shaped master bedroom, and a fabulous, funny little mini-bar. He drew a half-octagon dining room table that attached to a wall, with rolling stools so low to the ground that they seem built for children. For the long wall of the living room, he designed a long built-in couch as the only seating.

Wright was quoted in the August 1958 issue of House and Home magazine as saying `We will have a good garden.` The house is planned to wrap around two sides of this garden. We must have as big a living room with as much vista and garden coming in as we can afford, with a fireplace in it, and open bookshelves, a dining table in the alcove, benches, and living room tables built in.

When the property was put up for sale in 1991, developers expressed interest in demolishing the home, which is in a desirable location and had been heavily modified since Wright's original design. Custom furniture had been removed, and finials and Ionic columns added, in contrast to Wright's Usonian style.

The home was purchased by two architecture enthusiasts who restored the home to Wright's plans and built a large addition, designed by Bob Inaba of Kirksey-Meyers, to make the house more liveable. The house was placed on the market again in 2021, at an asking price of $3.15 million.

== See also ==
- List of Frank Lloyd Wright works
