= Memorial City Mall =

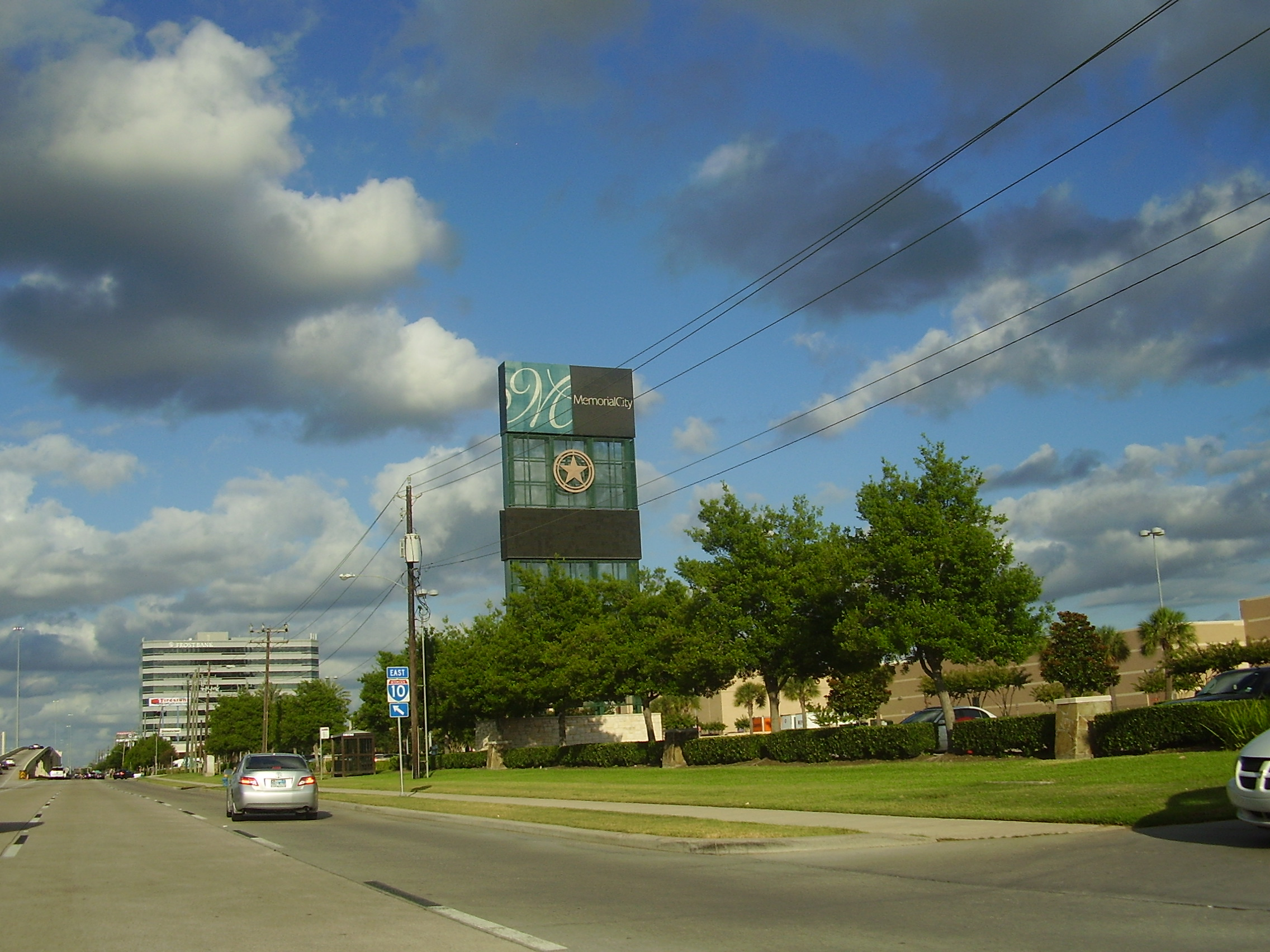
- Location: Houston, Texas, United States
- Coordinates: 29.7811°N 95.5395°W
- Address: 303 Memorial City Way
- Opened: 1966 (60 years ago)
- Owner: MetroNational
- Num. of stores: 112
- Num. of anchor tenants: 4
- Floor area: 1,700,000 sq ft (160,000 m^{2}).
- Floors: 1 with partial upper level to Cinemark (2 in Dillard's, Forever 21, JCPenney, Macy's, and former Sears)
- Public transit: METRO Routes 26, 39, 46, 70, 160, 161, 162
- Website: memorialcitymall.com

Memorial City Mall is a large shopping mall in Houston, Texas, approximately 11 miles (18 km) west of downtown Houston at the intersection of Interstate 10 and Gessner Road. The mall is in the Memorial City Management District, whose official legal name is the "Harris County Municipal Management District No. 1" under Chapter 3810 of the Texas Special District Local Laws Code. The mall is adjacent to the large Memorial Hermann Memorial City Medical Center. Constructed in the mid-1960s, the mall was renovated extensively in the early 2000s. It has since become one of the city's most popular malls. The mall's anchors are Target, JCPenney, Macy's, and Dillard's in addition to Cinemark.

== History ==
=== Memorial City Shopping Center ===
Construction on a freestanding Sears store and a freestanding Weingarten's supermarket on the site began in October 1963. Sears opened on October 16, 1964.

Memorial City Shopping Center was developed by MetroNational’s founder, Joseph Johnson and built around the two stores, starting in 1965. The Stanley-Warner Memorial Theater cinema opened first, on July 23, 1966, showing the Steve McQueen western Nevada Smith. The rest of the center was dedicated on August 25, 1966.

Montgomery Ward opened in 1972 as the mall's second anchor store, along with a new wing of the mall. The third anchor store, Foley's opened on February 21, 1974, along with the mall's new East Wing. In 1977, the Lord & Taylor anchor store opened, along with a new wing on the western side of the mall. With these additions, the mall had 1,300,000 square feet (120,000 m^{2}) of leasable space.

=== Rivalry with Town & Country Mall ===
Town & Country Mall opened nearby in 1983, at the intersection of Interstate 10 and Beltway 8, only one mile west of Memorial City Mall. The new mall featured upscale stores like Neiman Marcus and Marshall Field's.

To regain market share, Memorial City Mall underwent renovations. "Fame City" opened in 1989, a family entertainment complex with indoor mini-golf, kiddie rides, a video arcade, teen disco, a rollerskating rink, and an eight-screen Loew's Theatre. The mall also began hosting specialty conventions for items such as model trains. Fame City was not successful, however, and the mall continued to decline. In 1989, Lord & Taylor closed and was replaced that same year by Mervyn's.

Neiman Marcus announced in 1997 that it would move its store from Town & Country Mall to Memorial City Mall. The moved never happened, and Neiman Marcus remained at Town & Country Mall until 2006. During the construction of the Sam Houston Tollway, the visibility of the Town & Country Mall declined and access became difficult. In addition, the 1980s oil glut had a severe impact on Houston's economy and marked the beginning of the end of Town & Country Mall. The mall became less popular as its interior became dated. Dillard's moved from Town & Country to Memorial City in 2003. Town & Country Mall closed in 2004 and the mall interior was demolished shortly thereafter. JCPenney moved from their Town & Country anchor to Memorial City in 2006.

=== Revival ===
By the early 2000s, the area surrounding Memorial City Mall returned to prosperity, thanks to a US$500 million renovation project that took place from 2001 to 2005. During this period, over 100 retail shops were added to the complex, including five anchor stores.

Montgomery Ward closed in early 2001 and was demolished. A new, larger two-level Foley's opened on October 30, 2001. The old Foley's was demolished for a mall expansion. Lord & Taylor returned to the mall in March 2002, with a two-level store. The eight-screen Loew's Theater closed in 2002, after its owner, Trammell Crow Co., filed for bankruptcy.

In October 2003, an extended east concourse opened, along with Dillard's, on the site of the demolished original Foley's. Two parking garages were constructed as well. That same month, Target opened an anchor store on the site of the demolished Montgomery Ward. With the goal of "creating a total family experience", large-scale renovations of the mall continued through 2004 with the construction of a large 2,600 square feet (240 m^{2}) play area for children and an NHL-standard sized ice rink.

Lord & Taylor closed in 2005 and was replaced by JCPenney in February 2006. That same year, Mervyn's closed and was demolished, and all Foley's stores were converted to Macy's.

A new 16-screen Cinemark movie theater with stadium seating opened adjacent to Sears in May 2007.

From 2009 to 2010, a skyway was constructed across Gessner Road, connecting the mall to a 267-room Westin hotel at Memorial Hermann Memorial City Medical Center, which opened in March 2011.

Sears closed in November 2018 and the store, the first building on the site, was demolished in 2020.
