= CityCentre =

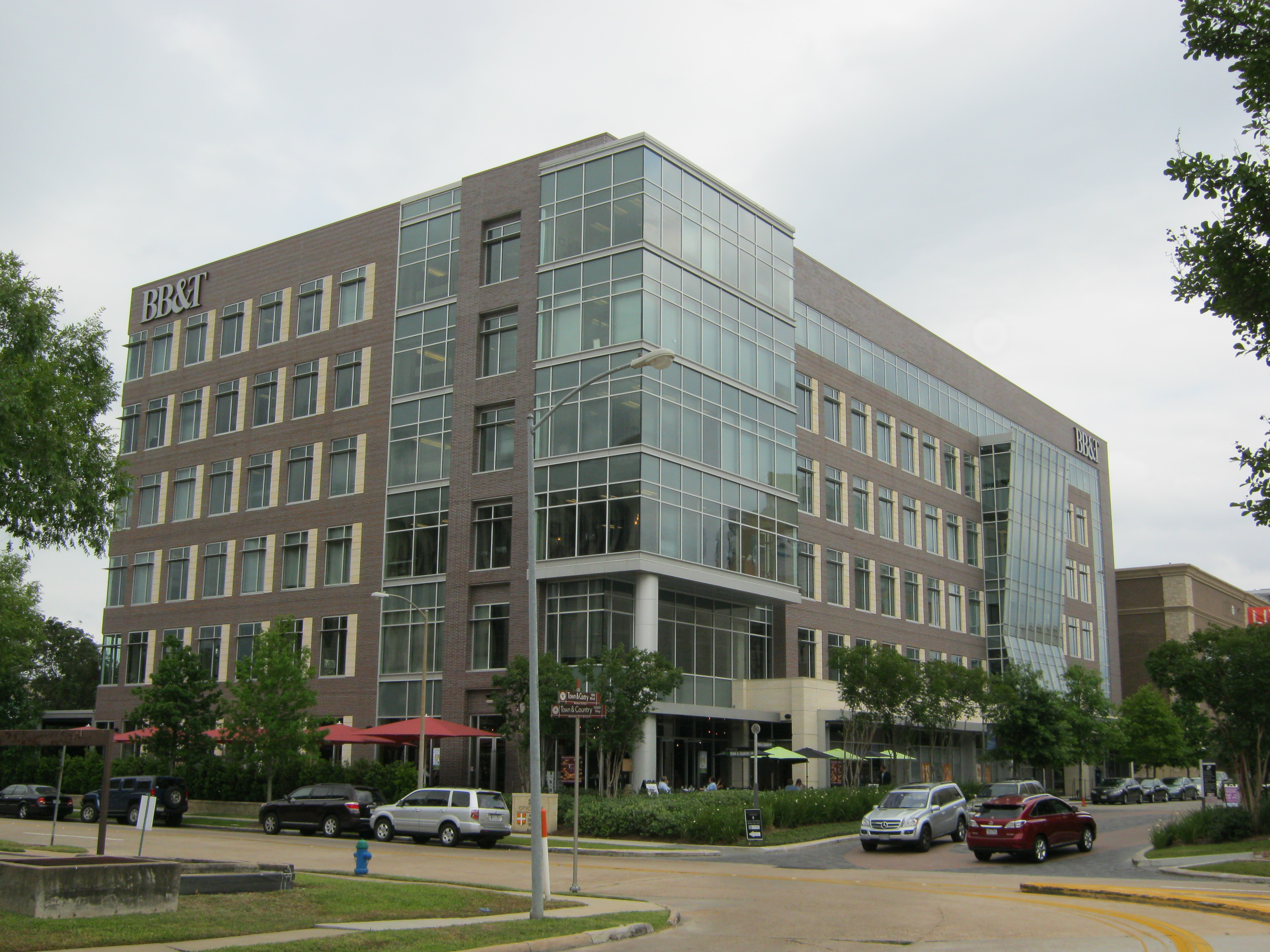
- BB&T-branded building at the northern entrance to CityCentre along Town and Country Way in 2010
- Location: Houston, Texas, United States
- Coordinates: 29.780470°N 95.560423°W
- Address: 800 Town & Country Boulevard
- Opened: 2009 (17 years ago)
- Developer: Midway Companies
- Floor area: 400,000 sq ft (37,000 m^{2})
- Public transit: METRO Route 39
- Website: citycentrehouston.com

CityCentre is a mixed-use development in the Memorial City district of Houston, Texas, located at the southeastern corner of the intersection of Interstate 10 (Katy Freeway) and Beltway 8. Opened in 2009, CityCentre is a 50-acre (20-hectare) development with 2.1 million square feet (200,000 m^{2}) of gross floor space, including 400,000 square feet (37,000 m^{2}) of retail, restaurants and entertainment, a 149,000-square-foot (13,800 m^{2}) fitness facility, 425,000 square feet (39,500 m^{2}) of office space, and a variety of rental and non-rental residential developments. CityCentre has been recognized by the Urban Land Institute as a successful example of walkable, high-density development and progressive site planning in the United States.

CityCentre is located on the former site of Town & Country Mall, a 1-million-square-foot (93,000 m^{2}) shopping center which competed with neighboring Memorial City Mall from 1983 to 2004. Poor accessibility to the site due to the construction of the Sam Houston Tollway, as well as a local recession in the late 1980s, resulted in the gradual decline of Town & Country into a dead mall. In 2004, the site was bought out by Midway Companies and closed to develop CityCentre. CityCentre is immediately north of Town & Country Village, an open-air shopping center which retains the 1960s-era Town & Country moniker.

== History ==
=== Beginnings (1983–1996) ===
In 1983, Town & Country Mall opened on Interstate 10 and Beltway 8 in Houston. Prior to its opening, Town & Country was originally supposed to be a magnet for high-end retail tenants, as well as being able to sign on some bluechip anchors, including Neiman Marcus, Marshall Field's, J.C. Penney and Joske's. The three-level mall debuted with anchor tenants Joske's (became Dillard's after 1987 acquisition), JCPenney, Marshall Field's (became Saks Fifth Avenue after 1996 acquisition) and Neiman Marcus. The large, comfortable interior attracted residents from all over the surrounding area. Many large anchors, such as Dillard's, continued to flourish in the golden years of the mall.

The mall initially had a large food court on the third floor in the JCPenney wing, but it was soon replaced by a children's store called Twelve & Under, which offered a selection of toys and clothing in addition to a giant play structure. The only restaurant that remained in the food court area was a McDonald's. It featured booths within the inline store as well as seating out on the mall street. Numerous other restaurants were located throughout the rest of the mall.

By the late 1980s, Memorial City Mall, a nearby rival, was teetering on the brink of closure after Town & Country had taken the neighboring mall's 20-year grasp as the leading mall away. Town & Country was very popular through the 1980s and the early and mid 1990s, yet the late 1990s saw a great depression.

=== Rapid decline (1997–2001) ===
Town & Country was a leader until the mid-1990s, when its popularity started to decrease. The mall was losing style with Houston shoppers as the interior became small and clogged while leasing space that was available could not handle larger stores that were demanded by many retailers. In fact, much of the mall's third level was vacant by the middle of the 1990s.

When the Beltway 8 and Interstate 10 interchange was rebuilt in 1989, it obscured the view of the mall from the highways, giving Memorial City Mall an advantage since it was at the next Interstate 10 exit. Also, it was very hard to access the mall due to the limited amount of signage guiding people to the mall, and the clogged traffic of the Beltway 8 and Interstate 10 frontage roads. JCPenney pulled out in 2000 with the closing of several other stores nationwide. By the late 1990s, Town & Country was desperate for shoppers and tried to persuade them to come back by hosting model train conventions and such, but the mall never regained strength. By 2000, the mall was almost empty.

=== Closure (2002–2005) ===
In 2002, Memorial City Mall saw its opportunity to take back thousands of shoppers and started a huge renovation project. Dillard's then announced it would leave the mall and relocate to Memorial City after their lease expired in 2003. By 2004, only Neiman Marcus and a handful of national and local retailers remained, and when Dillard's relocated to Memorial City in favor of large, inexpensive retail space, Town & Country saw no other option but to close. JCPenney reopened inside the former Lord & Taylor space in Memorial City Mall after Lord & Taylor vacated the property in 2005. Late in 2004, the mall was demolished save for Neiman Marcus, which was slated to become part of a new development on the site of the former mall. However, Neiman Marcus later closed with an official closing sale in early 2006. The building has also since been demolished.

Following the demolition of the mall, all that remained were the mall's parking garages. In 2007, construction on a brand new outdoor shopping center, dubbed CityCentre, began. In mid-2008, the last structure from the original Town & Country Mall (the mall's entrance sign on the Beltway 8 frontage road) was taken down and replaced with a CityCentre sign. The new mall opened in early 2010.

== General design ==
The CityCentre was designed to be pedestrian friendly and car-independent. Since Houston has a low population density, and flourishing suburbs, the CityCentre is marketed towards people desiring to live in the city without having to travel far for food or the office.

- Hotel Sorella
- RA Sushi
- Eddie V's
- Cyclone Anaya's
- Bistro Alex
- Norris Conference Center
- Sur La Table
- Sweet Paris

=== Former outlets ===
- Amegy Bank of Texas
- Bistro Alex
- bevello
- Charming Charlie
- Dryden Kreps
- Elaine Turner
- Eye Couture
- Flora & Muse
- Houston Motor Club
- Houston Texans Grille
- ivivva
- Jamba Juice
- LMD Boutique
- Monnalisa Bar
- Muir Fine Art Gallery
- Olive & Vine
- Red Mango
- Ruggles Green
- Salata
- Straits Restaurant
