= Group 1 Automotive =

Car dealership group in the United States

Group 1 Automotive, Inc.
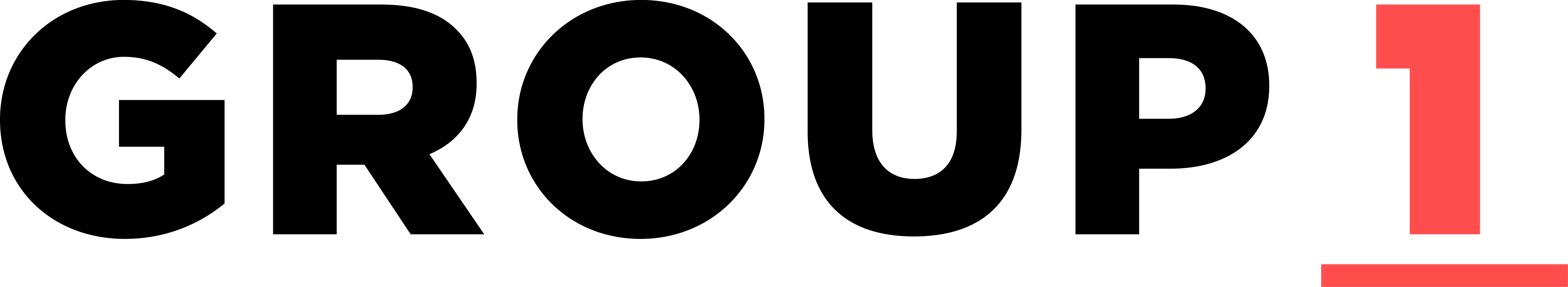
- Trade name: Group 1 Automotive
- Type: Public
- Traded as: NYSE: GPI; S&P 600 component
- Industry: Car dealership
- Founded: 1997
- Founders: Bob Howard, Sterling McCall, Charles Smith, Kevin Whalen
- Headquarters: Houston, Texas, U.S.
- Number of locations: 259 - Total Locations 144 - US Locations 115 - UK Locations
- Area served: United States, United Kingdom
- Key people: Daryl Kenningham (CEO), Daniel McHenry (CFO)
- Services: Automotive sales, financing, service, repair and parts
- Revenue: ▲US$22.6 billion (2025)
- Net income: ▼US$325 million (2025)
- Number of employees: 20,413 (2024)
- Subsidiaries: Bohn Holdings, Chandlers Garage Holdings, GPI Ltd, Group 1 Automotive UK Limited, Group 1 Funding, Ira Automotive Group, Mike Smith Autoplaza, Mike Smith Autoplex, Miller Automotive Group, Miller Imports, Bob Howard Automotive East, Bob Howard Motors, Rockwall Automotive, Lubbock Motors, Maxwell Ford, Mike Smith Imports, Amarillo Motors-F
- Website: www.group1auto.com

Group 1 Automotive, Inc. is an international Fortune 300 automotive retailer with automotive dealerships and collision centers in the United States and the United Kingdom. Group 1 sells new and used cars and light trucks, arranges financial services, provides maintenance and repair services, and sells vehicle parts. As of 2024, the company employs over 20,000 people globally.

The company is led by CEO Daryl Kenningham and CFO Daniel McHenry.

== History ==
Group 1 was founded as a public corporation in 1997 with B. B. Hollingsworth as chairman and CEO. The founding dealership owners were Bob Howard of Oklahoma City, Sterling McCall, Kevin Whalen of Houston, and Charles Smith of Beaumont.

Subsequent acquisitions in the US include the Gene Messer Automotive Group, Maxwell Auto Group, Ira Motor Group, Bohn Auto Group, Pat Peck Auto Group, Miller Automotive Group among many others. These are based in various locations in the United States. In 2021, Group 1 completed its largest acquisition, the Prime Automotive Group, consisting of 28 dealerships in the northeast U.S.

Group 1 also acquired dealer groups in the U.K. including: Barons Group, Chandlers Group, Essex Audi Group, Elms Group, Think Ford, Spire Automotive, Robinsons Motor Group, and the Beadles Group.

Group 1 purchased the Brazilian automotive dealership group UAB Motors Participacoes S.A. in 2013 and operated as Group 1 Automotive Brazil. Professional race car driver André Ribeiro and his family of dealerships were notable parts of this acquisition. Group 1 divested its Brazilian operations in 2022.

As of 2021, Group 1 is ranked as the fourth largest automotive retailer in the United States, operating 202 dealerships and representing brands such as BMW, Volkswagen, Ford, Toyota, Audi, Mercedes-Benz, Honda, Chrysler, Dodge, Jeep, Ram, GMC, Nissan, Land Rover, Acura, Buick, Chevrolet, and Lexus among many others. Group 1 also operates 44 collision centers in the U.S. and the U.K.

== Locations ==
In the US, Group 1 Automotive has dealerships in Alabama, California, Florida, Georgia, Kansas, Louisiana, Maine, Maryland, Massachusetts, Mississippi, New Hampshire, New Jersey, New Mexico, New York, Oklahoma, South Carolina, and Texas. Their corporate headquarters is in the Memorial City district of Houston, Texas.

== Products and services ==
In response to used vehicle retailing trends, the Val-U-Line brand was launched in 2018 to offer enhanced benefits for consumers purchasing older, higher mileage vehicles such as a three-day/300 mile return policy and Carfax vehicle history reports. Initial investment impacted forecasts but future earnings were positive, contributing to a 13.9% increase in used vehicle sales for 2018.

In 2019, the company created AcceleRide, a digital retailing platform allowing customers to purchase, sell, or arrange service for vehicles online. The platform also provides vehicle financing, trade-in appraisals, and offsite delivery options.

== Philanthropy ==
With individual dealerships engage in local philanthropic efforts often independent from the corporate office, Group 1 supports Houston-area causes focusing on community outreach and grade school education. Employees regularly make brown bag lunches to support Kids' Meals and donated cargo vans for their Meals on Wheels deliveries.

The company is partnered with the National Multiple Sclerosis Society as the official vehicle sponsor of the Texas MS 150; SEARCH Homeless Services; and Junior Achievement of South East Texas for events, classroom mentoring, and the JA Company Program in Spring Branch ISD. Starting in November 2017, Group 1 partnered with the Houston Independent School District to reward their Teacher of the Month recipients with a new vehicle to drive for the month.

=== The Group 1 Foundation ===
The Group 1 Foundation was initially created to support employees impacted by Hurricane Katrina, closely followed by Hurricane Rita. This tax-exempt charity gives all proceeds to help fellow employees in times of hardship. Examples include supporting survivors of fatal car accidents and a fire at an employee's home.

Subsequent natural disasters like the 2013 Moore tornado, Hurricane Sandy, Hurricane Harvey, and Hurricane Michael also marked the need for the Group 1 Foundation to assist their employees.
