= Town & Country Village (Houston) =

- Location: Houston, Texas, United States
- Coordinates: 29.7740462°N 95.561468°W
- Address: 12850 Memorial Drive
- Developer: Moody Rambin
- Num. of stores: 90
- Floor area: 550,000 square feet (51,000 m^{2})
- Website: townandcountryvillage.com

Town & Country Village is an open-air shopping center in western Houston, Texas, United States, within the Memorial City district. The complex straddles the northbound frontage road of Beltway 8, north of Memorial Drive and south of CityCentre. From 1983 to 2004, Town & Country Village neighbored Town & Country Mall, an enclosed shopping mall which was located on the present-day CityCentre site. The 43-acre (17-hectare) development features over 550,000 square feet (51,000 m^{2}) of retail space and a 10-story, 250,000-square-foot (23,000 m^{2}) office building. Town & Country Village is owned by Houston-area development firm Moody Rambin.

== History ==
The Original Town & Country Village was built in the 1960s with Joske's and Sakowitz among its anchors. In 1983, the north end of the center was redeveloped as Town & Country Mall, anchored by the existing Joske's along with JCPenney, Marshall Field's (later Saks Fifth Avenue) and Neiman Marcus. The mall was torn down in 2005.

By the late 1980s, the original village had Oshman's, Palais Royal, Continental Foods and Sakowitz. Sakowitz closed in 1990. Town & County Village was redeveloped in 1996, featuring Barnes & Noble and Randall's Food Markets.
