= Sweet Paris =

American creperie chain

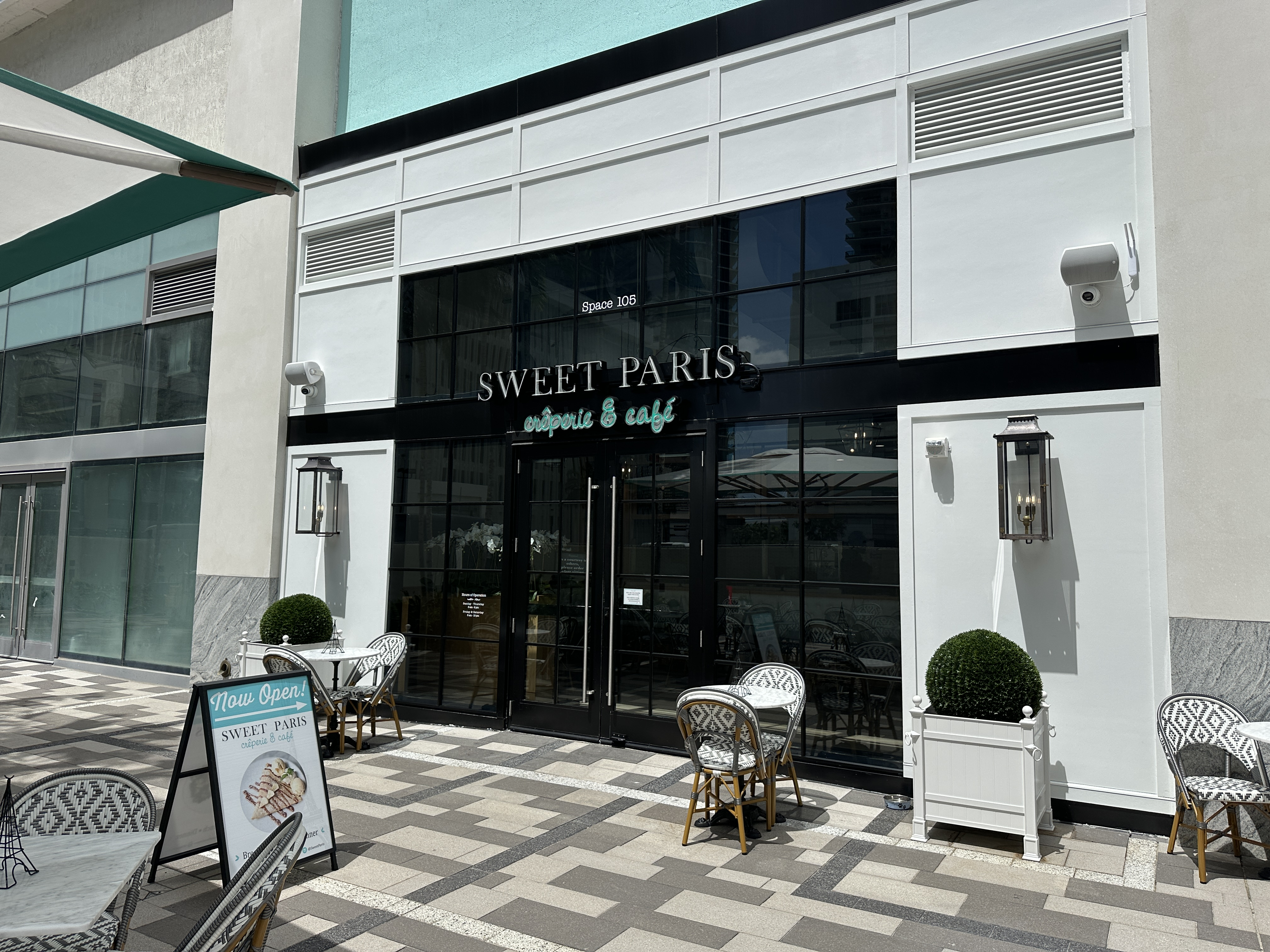
- Sweet Paris cafe at Miami Worldcenter

Restaurant information
- Established: 2012 (14 years ago)
- Food type: Confectionary
- Location: United States

Sweet Paris Crêperie and Café is a creperie chain based in Houston, Texas. Founded in 2012, it currently operates out of 29 owned and franchised locations in the United States, across Texas, Florida, Minnesota, Arizona, Arkansas, Tennessee, North Carolina, Alabama and two in Mexico. The menu features crêpes, waffles, and full-course café offerings. Beverages include milkshakes and beer. The chain is known for its large patios.

In 2022, it was included in Entrepreneur’s Franchise 500. In 2025, it was included in Nation's Restaurant News’s (NRN) list of 100 emerging restaurant chains with fewer than 100 locations.

The chain donates meals to local food banks for each crêpe sold with a food bank logo on the menu.
