= Memorial Hermann Memorial City Medical Center =

Hospital in Texas, United States

Coordinates: 29.7811°N 95.5459°W

- Memorial Hermann Health System

Geography
- Location: 921 Gessner Road, Houston, Texas, United States

Organization
- Care system: Nonprofit
- Type: General

Services
- Emergency department: Level IV trauma center

Links
- Website: memorialhermann.org/locations/memorial-city
- Lists: Hospitals in Texas

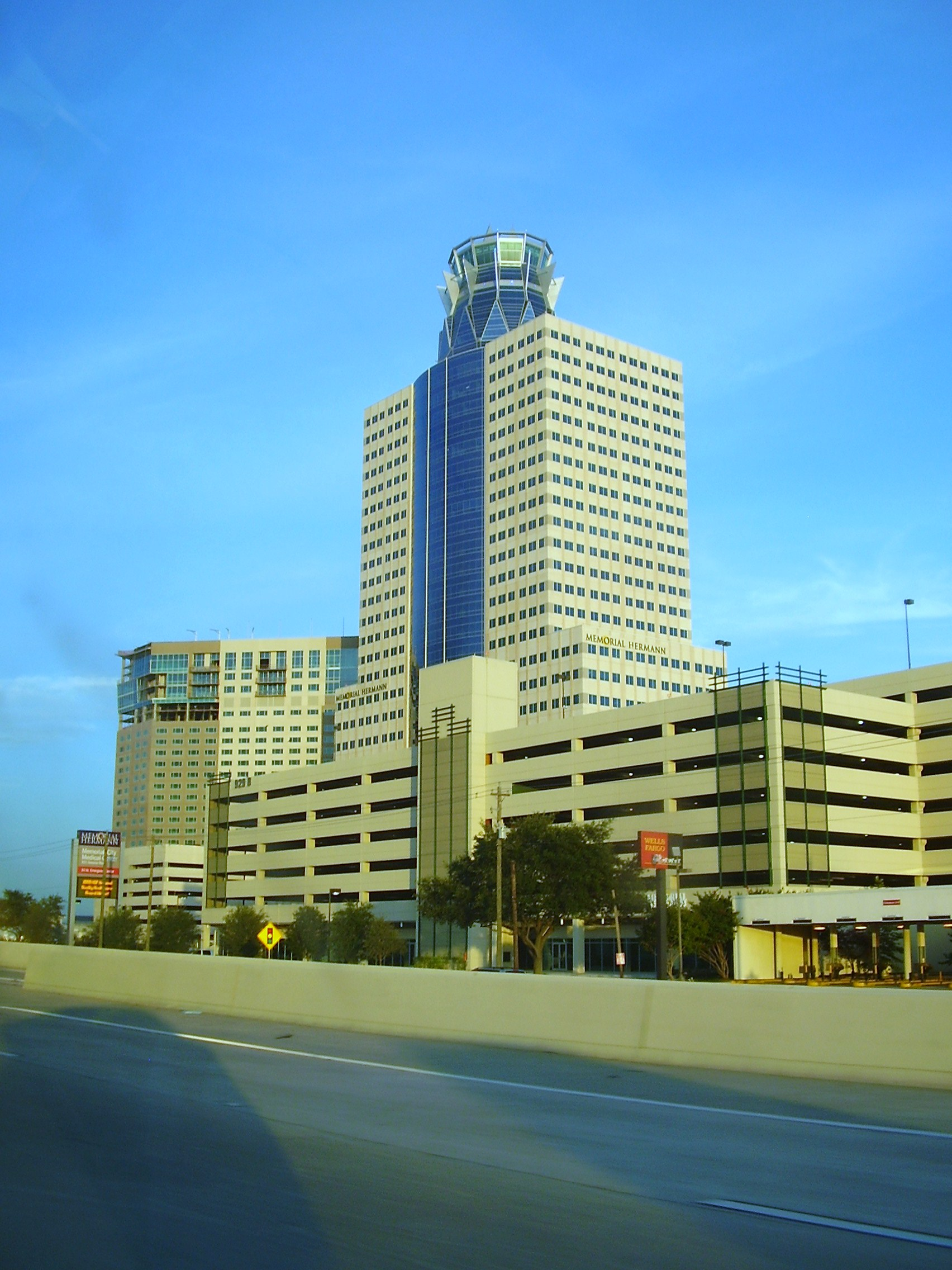
Memorial Hermann Memorial City Medical Center

The Memorial Hermann Memorial City Medical Center is a hospital located in Memorial City, Houston, Texas. This complex is the tallest hospital in the United States of America. It is a part of the Memorial Hermann Healthcare System and houses the system's headquarters. Pediatric care to the hospital is provided by doctors from Children's Memorial Hermann Hospital which treats infants, children, teens, and young adults age 0-21.

== History ==
The hospital opened in 1971 as Memorial City General Hospital and took its current name in 1988. As of 2007 it had 527 beds and cares for over 25,000 patients per year.

In July 2006 the hospital system and MetroNational Corp. announced plans to build the Memorial Hermann Tower. As of July 2010, the tenant space in the Memorial City complex had an occupancy rate of 65-70%. On July 9, 2010 the hospital system entered into a lease for over 800,000 square feet (74,000 m^{2}) of office space with MetroNational Corp., involving the building formerly named the North Tower and the Medical Office Buildings 1–4 on the Memorial City campus. The hospital system continued to use Transwestern to handle the leasing and management. The new Memorial Hermann tower was scheduled to open on December 6, 2009.

In 2013 the hospital was ranked No. 5 in the NerdWallet list of the ten most affordable hospitals in the State of Texas.

== Facilities ==
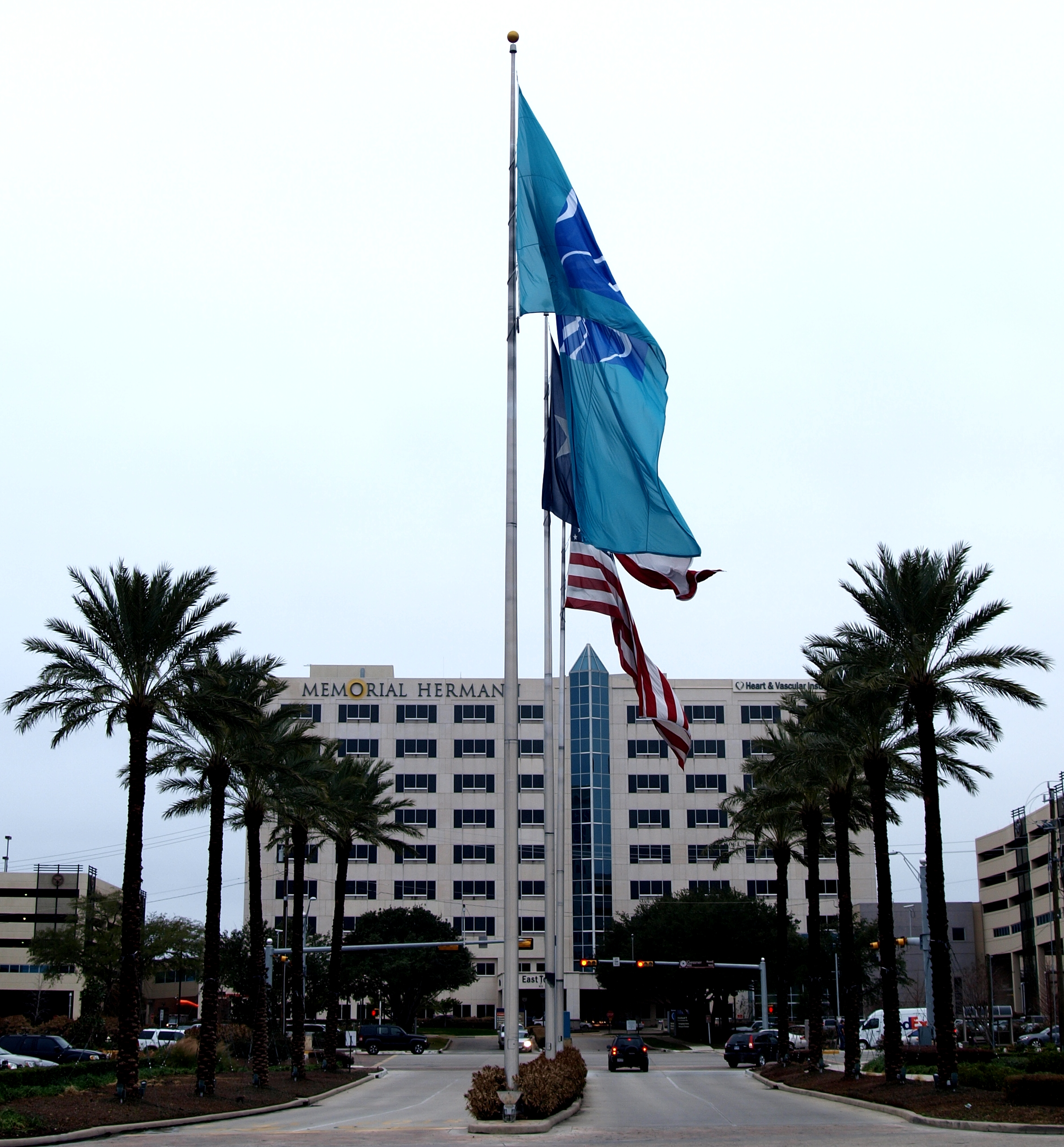

The hospital is located in Memorial City at the intersection of Interstate 10 and Gessner Road. As of 2009 the hospital has 427 licensed beds and a maximum capacity of 647 beds. It also has a total of 2,500,000 square feet (230,000 m^{2}) of space. The hospital system includes the 35-story, 915,000 square feet (85,000 m^{2}) Memorial Hermann Tower, the System Services Building (formerly the North Tower), the East Tower, the Heart and Vascular Institute, and the original hospital building. The original hospital is in the middle of the campus with other buildings surrounding it. The land on which the Memorial Hermann Tower was built, the corner of I-10 and Gessner, was previously vacant. The system planned to dedicate the first 15 floors to inpatient services including cancer, medical/surgical, and women's services. The higher floors were to be used for office space for the system, physician offices, and outpatient services.

The headquarters of the health care system are located in the Memorial Hermann Tower. The headquarters were scheduled to move there from a facility on Interstate 69/U.S. Highway 59 (Southwest Freeway) in mid-2010. In 2006 developers stated that the Memorial Hermann Tower would be the tallest building in the I-10 corridor in western Houston. In 2006 Marshall Heins, the system's vice president of construction, real estate and support services, said that the Memorial City location was chosen as the system headquarters because "The Memorial City area happens to be the geographic hub of Houston as well as the Memorial Hermann Healthcare System. All our facilities are easy to get to on Beltway 8, so we wanted a location that was close to it." The new Memorial Hermann Tower building and the renovated North Tower have a total of 375,000 square feet (34,800 m^{2}) of space.

The former North Tower was to be renovated for system office leasing and its former functions were to move to the new Memorial Hermann Tower. The 2000s expansion, which had a price tag of $200 million, also included a parking garage and a skybridge to the Memorial City Mall.

In 2009 the hospital opened the Children's Emergency Center. The facility has six rooms designed for the care of pediatric patients. It is includes books, fish tanks, televisions, and murals. The medical equipment available, including special intravenous lines and smaller blood pressure cuffs, is designed for pediatric patients.

The hospital houses the Technical Education Center, a 18,000-square-foot (1,700 m^{2}) facility. It is a center for training programs for licensed surgical technology, vocational nursing, and radiology. It opened on March 27, 2003. Previously training for those programs was offered in various Memorial Hermann locations.

== Hospital rating data ==
The HealthGrades website contains the clinical quality data for Memorial Hermann Memorial City Medical Center, as of 2018. For this rating section clinical quality rating data and patient safety ratings are presented.

For inpatient conditions and procedures, there are three possible ratings: worse than expected, as expected, better than expected. For this hospital the data for this category is:

- Worse than expected - 2
- As expected - 15
- Better than expected - 19

For patient safety ratings the same three possible ratings are used. For this hospital they are:

- Worse than expected - 0
- As expected - 7
- Better than expected - 6

Percent of patients who would rate this hospital as a 9 or 10 - 81%. Percent of patients nationally who rate hospitals on average a 9 or 10 - 69%.
