= Bunker Hill Village, Texas =

City in Harris County, Texas, US

City of Bunker Hill Village
- City
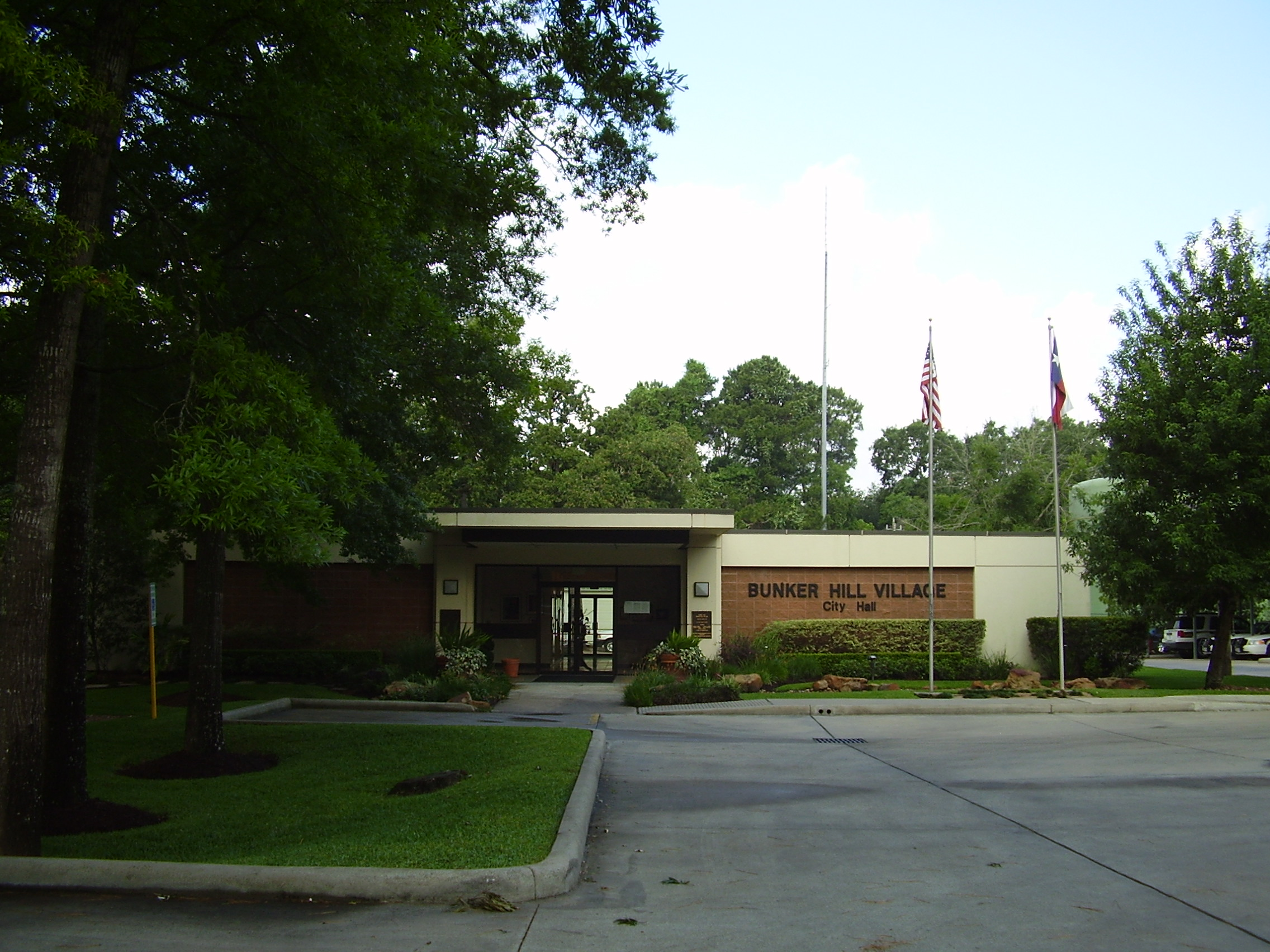
- Bunker Hill Village City Hall
- Interactive map of City of Bunker Hill Village
- Coordinates: 29°46′1″N 95°32′9″W
- Country: United States
- State: Texas
- County: Harris

Government
  - Mayor: Robert P. Lord

Area
  - Total: 1.44 sq mi (3.73 km^{2})
  - Land: 1.44 sq mi (3.73 km^{2})
  - Water: 0 sq mi (0.00 km^{2})
- Elevation: 82 ft (25 m)

Population (2020)
  - Total: 3,822
  - Density: 2,729.1/sq mi (1,053.72/km^{2})
- Time zone: UTC-6 (Central (CST))
  - Summer (DST): UTC-5 (CDT)
- ZIP code: 77024
- Area code: 713
- FIPS code: 48-11300
- GNIS feature ID: 1372828
- Website: bunkerhilltx.gov

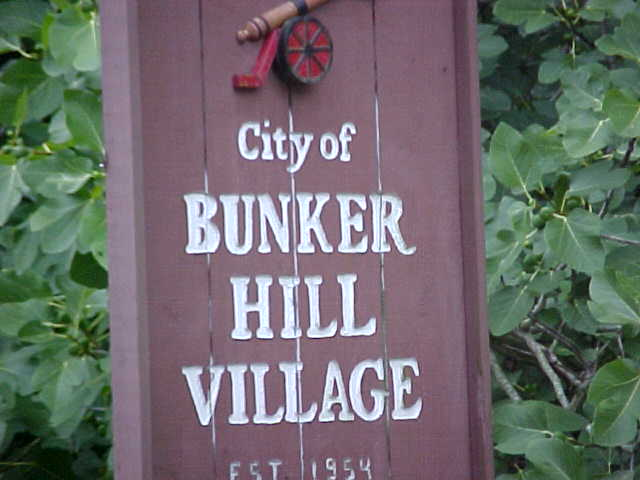
Sign indicating the city

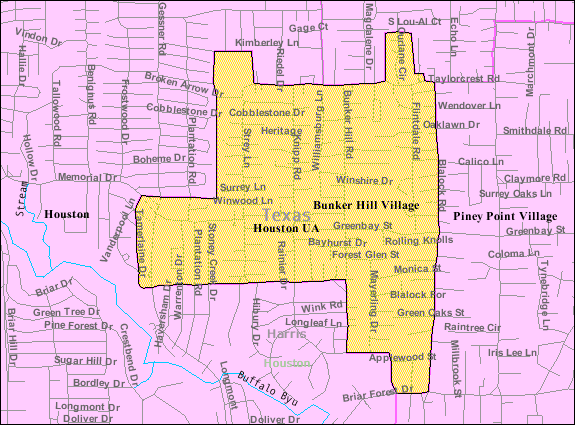
Map of Bunker Hill Village

Bunker Hill Village is a city in Harris County, Texas, United States, part of Houston–Pasadena–The Woodlands metropolitan area. The population was 3,822 at the 2020 census. It is part of a collection of upscale residential communities in west Houston known as the Memorial Villages. As of 2010, Bunker Hill Village was the sixth wealthiest place in Texas. Also, Bunker Hill Village is one of Forbes' top 25 places to retire rich.

While Bunker Hill Village is an independent municipality and not part of the City of Houston, the United States Postal Service uses "Houston" for all Bunker Hill Village addresses.

== History ==
Prior to the city's incorporation, German farmers settled the area and built sawmills to process local lumber. A 1936 county highway map states that the area had scattered residences near one of its sawmills.

In the mid-1950s, effort to form a Spring Branch municipality failed. The city incorporated in December 1954 with a mayor-council government. Because of the 1954 incorporation, Houston did not incorporate Bunker Hill Village's territory into its city limits, while Houston annexed surrounding areas that were unincorporated. In 1962 the city had 2,216 people. By 1966 Bunker Hill Village became affluent and had two public schools and two churches. In 1981, 4,442 people lived in Bunker Hill Village.

In 2008, Forbes.com selected Bunker Hill Village along with Sugar Land and Hunters Creek Village as one of the three Houston-area "Top Suburbs to Live Well" of Houston.

The historic William L. Thaxton Jr. House is located within the city limits, which was designed by world-famous architect Frank Lloyd Wright.

== Geography ==
Bunker Hill Village is located at 29°46′1″N 95°32′9″W (29.767058, –95.535969).

According to the United States Census Bureau, the city has a total area of 1.5 square miles (3.9 km^{2}), all land.

== Demographics ==
Historical population
Census	Pop.	Note	%±
1960	2,216		—
1970	3,977		79.5%
1980	3,750		−5.7%
1990	3,391		−9.6%
2000	3,654		7.8%
2010	3,633		−0.6%
2020	3,822		5.2%
U.S. Decennial Census; 1850–1900 1910; 1920 1930 1940 1950 1960 1970 1980 1990 2000; 2010

=== Racial and ethnic composition ===
Bunker Hill Village city, Texas – Racial and ethnic composition Note: the US Census treats Hispanic/Latino as an ethnic category. This table excludes Latinos from the racial categories and assigns them to a separate category. Hispanics/Latinos may be of any race.
Race / Ethnicity (NH = Non-Hispanic)	Pop 2000	Pop 2010	Pop 2020	% 2000	% 2010	% 2020
White alone (NH)	3,235	3,000	2,737	88.53%	82.58%	71.61%
Black or African American alone (NH)	9	11	23	0.25%	0.30%	0.60%
Native American or Alaska Native alone (NH)	3	4	5	0.08%	0.11%	0.13%
Asian alone (NH)	236	354	575	6.46%	9.74%	15.04%
Native Hawaiian or Pacific Islander alone (NH)	1	2	0	0.03%	0.06%	0.00%
Other race alone (NH)	0	18	5	0.00%	0.50%	0.13%
Mixed race or Multiracial (NH)	42	42	170	1.15%	1.16%	4.45%
Hispanic or Latino (any race)	128	202	307	3.50%	5.56%	8.03%
Total	3,654	3,633	3,822	100.00%	100.00%	100.00%

=== 2020 census ===
As of the 2020 census, Bunker Hill Village had a population of 3,822. The median age was 45.5 years. 27.1% of residents were under the age of 18 and 18.9% of residents were 65 years of age or older. For every 100 females there were 99.7 males, and for every 100 females age 18 and over there were 96.4 males age 18 and over. There were 1,182 families residing in the city.

100.0% of residents lived in urban areas, while 0% lived in rural areas.

There were 1,217 households in Bunker Hill Village, of which 44.6% had children under the age of 18 living in them. Of all households, 84.0% were married-couple households, 5.1% were households with a male householder and no spouse or partner present, and 9.9% were households with a female householder and no spouse or partner present. About 7.8% of all households were made up of individuals and 5.7% had someone living alone who was 65 years of age or older.

There were 1,275 housing units, of which 4.5% were vacant. Among occupied housing units, 96.2% were owner-occupied and 3.8% were renter-occupied. The homeowner vacancy rate was 2.0% and the rental vacancy rate was 2.0%.

Racial composition as of the 2020 census
Race	Percent
White	73.4%
Black or African American	0.6%
American Indian and Alaska Native	0.2%
Asian	15.1%
Native Hawaiian and Other Pacific Islander	<0.1%
Some other race	0.8%
Two or more races	10.0%
Hispanic or Latino (of any race)	8.0%

=== 2010 census ===
As of the census^{[1]} of 2010, there were 3,542 people and 1,259 households. The racial makeup of the city was 87.7% White, 0.3% African American, 0.1% Native American, 9.7% Asian, 0.06% Pacific Islander, 0.8% from other races, and 1.23% from two or more races. Hispanic or Latino of any race were 5.6% of the population.

=== 2000 census ===
As of the census of 2000, there were 3,654 people, 1,226 households, and 1,085 families residing in the city. The population density was 2,505.1 inhabitants per square mile (967.2/km^{2}). There were 1,267 housing units at an average density of 868.6 per square mile (335.4/km^{2}). The racial makeup of the city was 91.49% White, 0.25% African American, 0.08% Native American, 6.46% Asian, 0.03% Pacific Islander, 0.47% from other races, and 1.23% from two or more races. Hispanic or Latino of any race were 3.50% of the population.

There were 1,226 households, out of which 44.4% had children under the age of 18 living with them, 83.5% were married couples living together, 4.1% had a female householder with no husband present, and 11.5% were non-families. 10.5% of all households were made up of individuals, and 7.4% had someone living alone who was 65 years of age or older. The average household size was 2.97 and the average family size was 3.19.

In the city, the population was spread out, with 29.9% under the age of 18, 4.0% from 18 to 24, 17.8% from 25 to 44, 31.9% from 45 to 64, and 16.4% who were 65 years of age or older. The median age was 44 years. For every 100 females, there were 92.8 males. For every 100 females age 18 and over, there were 91.6 males.

The median income for a household in the city was $177,274, and the median income for a family was $200,000. Males had a median income of $100,000 versus $38,214 for females. The per capita income for the city was $86,434. About 2.7% of families and 3.0% of the population were below the poverty line, including 3.1% of those under age 18 and 3.8% of those age 65 or over.

== Government and infrastructure ==
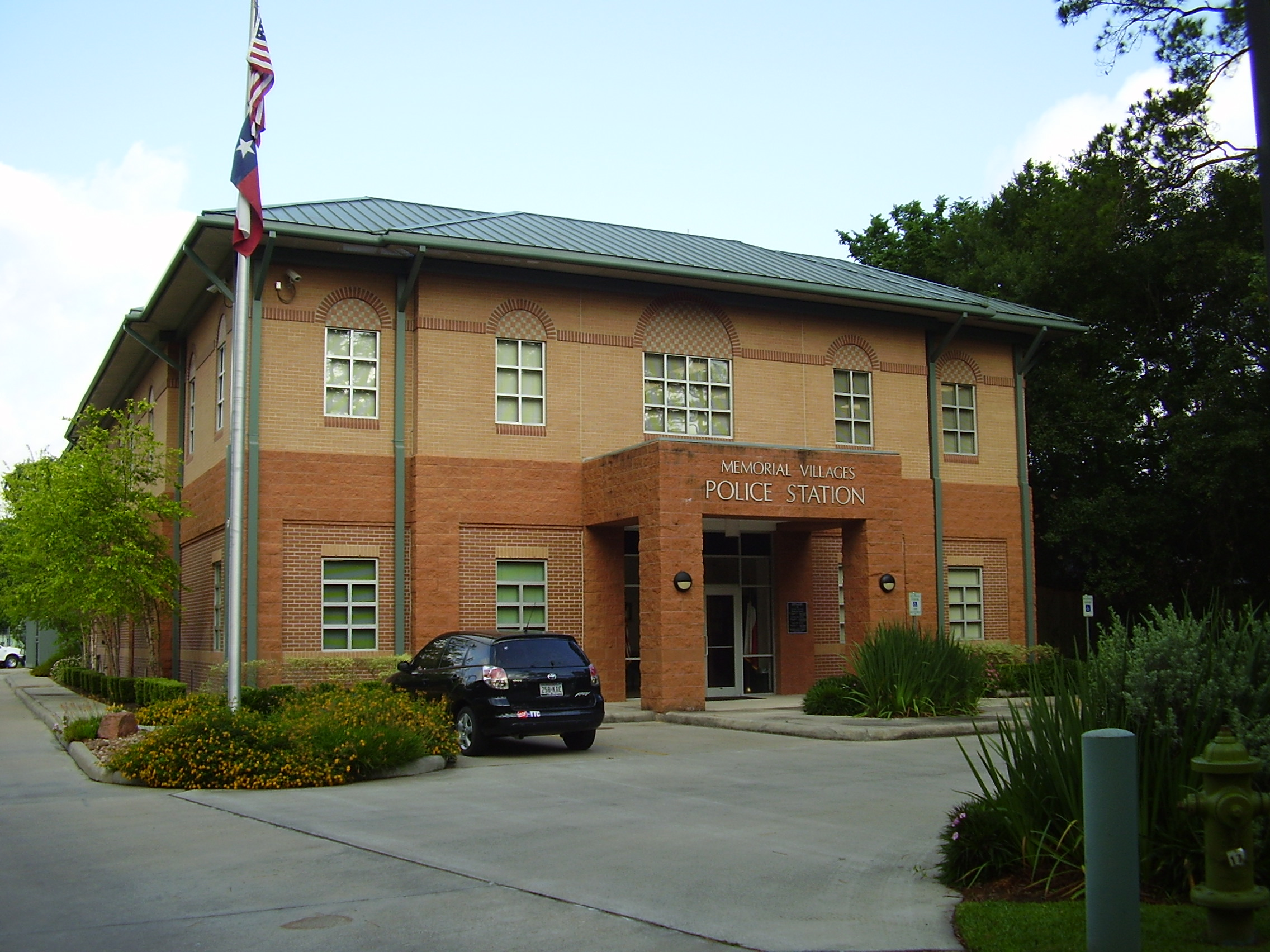
Memorial Villages Police Station

Bunker Hill Village, Hunters Creek Village, and Piney Point Village jointly operate the Memorial Villages Police Department. The Village Fire Department serves all of the Memorial villages.

Harris County Precinct Three, headed by Steve Radack as of 2008, serves Bunker Hill Village.

Bunker Hill Village is located in District 133 of the Texas House of Representatives. As of 2018 Jim Murphy represents the district. Bunker Hill Village is within District 7 of the Texas Senate; as of 2008 Dan Patrick represents the district.

Bunker Hill Village is in Texas's 7th congressional district; in 2008, the pro-Republican Party publication Human Events identified the zip code 77024 as the zip code that gave the eighth largest contribution to John McCain's 2008 U.S. Presidential Election campaign. The zip code, which includes Hedwig Village, gave $540,309 by October 24, 2008. As of 2019, however, the 7th congressional district is represented by a Democrat, Lizzie Pannill Fletcher.

The United States Postal Service location serving 77024 is the Memorial Park Post Office at 10505 Town and Country Way, Houston, Texas, 77024-9998.

Harris Health System (formerly Harris County Hospital District) designated Northwest Health Center for ZIP code 77024. The nearest public hospital is Ben Taub General Hospital in the Texas Medical Center.

== Politics ==
In the 2016 presidential election, Bunker Hill Village went to Republican nominee Donald Trump with 1,429 votes (65%) while Democratic nominee Hillary Clinton received 675 votes (31%). In the 2020 presidential election, Bunker Hill Village tallied 1,612 votes (63%) for Republican nominee Trump and 903 votes (35%) for Democratic nominee Joe Biden. In the 2024 presidential election, Republican nominee Trump garnered 1,556 votes (66%) in Bunker Hill Village to Democratic nominee Kamala Harris's 726 votes (31%).

== Education ==
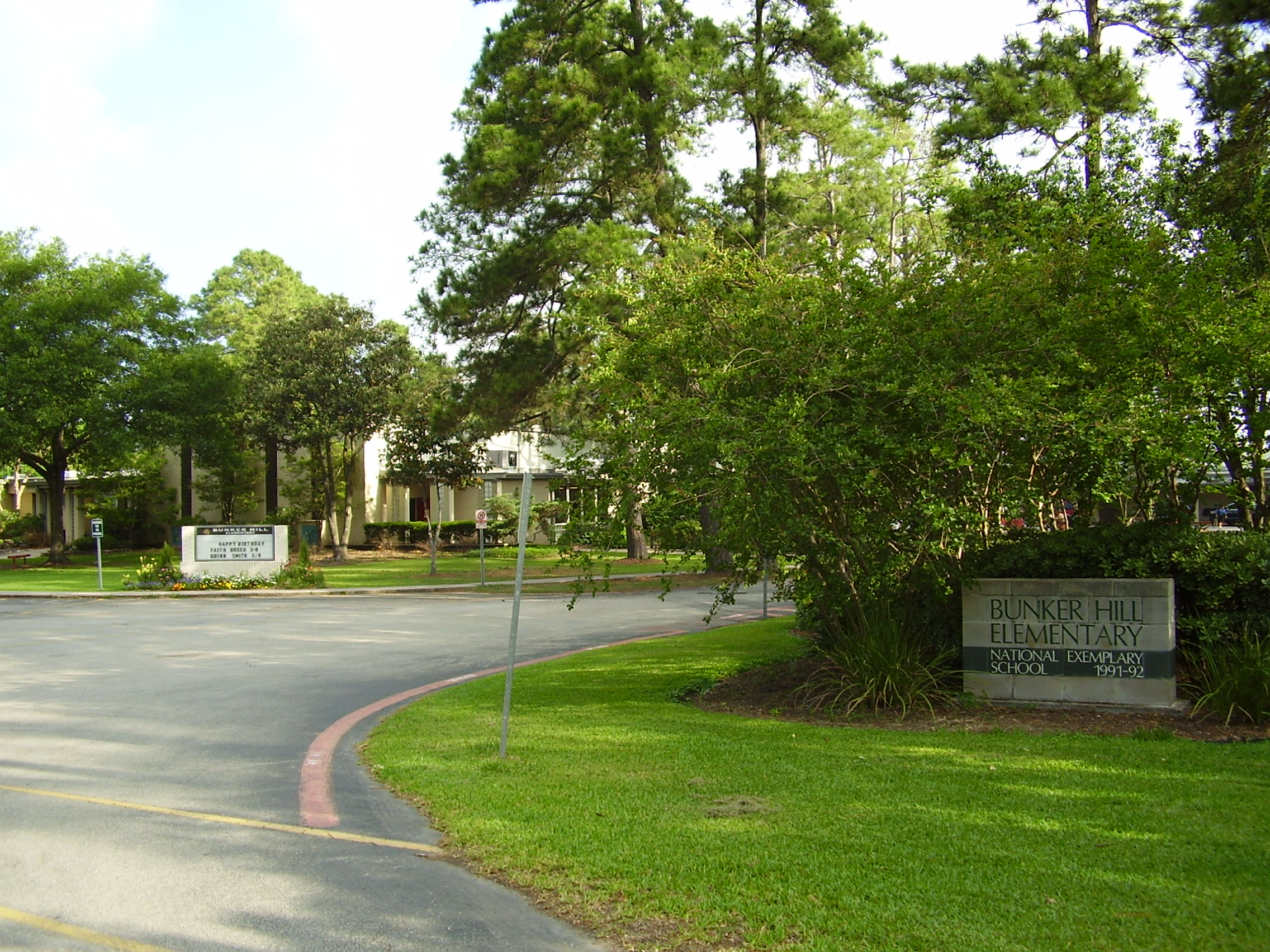
Bunker Hill Elementary School

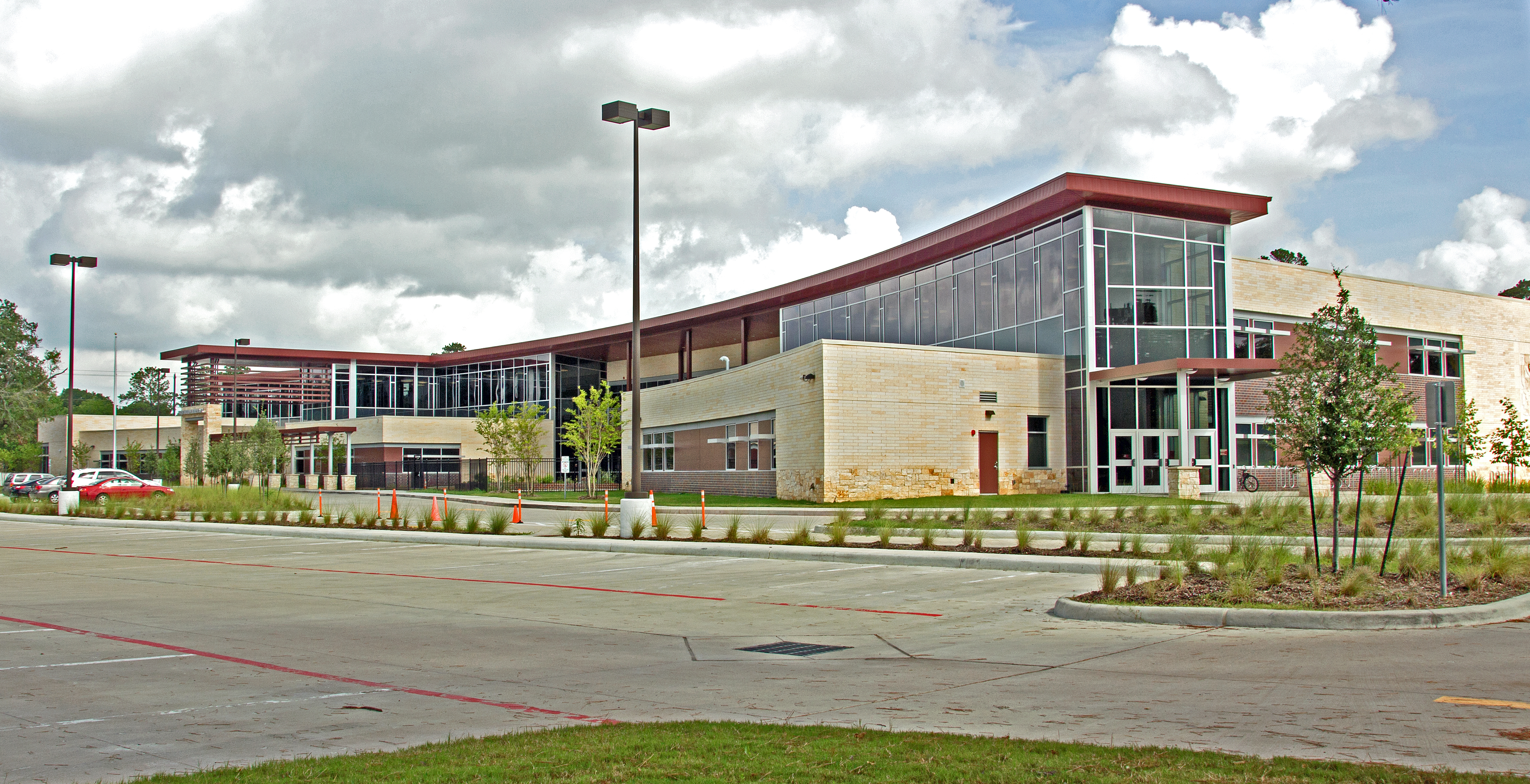
Frostwood Elementary School

=== Colleges and universities ===
Spring Branch ISD (and therefore the city of Bunker Hill Village) is served by the Houston Community College System. The Northwest College operates the nearby Town & Country Square Campus in Houston.

=== Primary and secondary schools ===
==== Public schools ====
Bunker Hill Village is served by Spring Branch Independent School District.

All residents are assigned to Wildcat Way School in Houston for preschool.

Two elementary schools, Bunker Hill Elementary School and Frostwood Elementary School, are located in the city limits and serve two separate portions of Bunker Hill Village. A small portion is served by Memorial Drive Elementary School in Piney Point Village.

The western portion of Bunker Hill Village is served by Memorial Middle School (in Houston), while the eastern portion is served by Spring Branch Middle School (in Hedwig Village).

All of Bunker Hill Village is served by Memorial High School, which is located in Hedwig Village.

=== Public libraries ===
The Harris County Public Library (HCPL) system operates the Spring Branch Memorial Branch at 930 Corbindale Road in Hedwig Village. The 10,500-square-foot (980 m^{2}) branch opened in 1975.

== Media ==
The Houston Chronicle is the area regional newspaper.

The Memorial Examiner is a local newspaper distributed in the community.
