= Mike McQueen (baseball) =

American baseball player (1950–2017)

- Mike McQueen with the Atlanta Braves
- Pitcher
- Born: August 30, 1950; Oklahoma City, Oklahoma, U.S.
- Died: October 9, 2017 (aged 67); Batesville, Arkansas, U.S.
- Batted: Left Threw: Left

MLB debut
- October 2, 1969, for the Atlanta Braves

Last MLB appearance
- June 15, 1974, for the Cincinnati Reds

MLB statistics
- Win–loss record: 5–11
- Earned run average: 4.66
- Strikeouts: 140
- Stats at Baseball Reference

Teams
- Atlanta Braves (1969–1972); Cincinnati Reds (1974)

Michael Robert McQueen (August 30, 1950 – October 9, 2017) was an American professional baseball pitcher. He pitched during five seasons of Major League Baseball between 1969 and 1974 for the Atlanta Braves and Cincinnati Reds.

== Career ==
=== Braves ===
McQueen was drafted out of Spring Branch High School by the Braves in the fourth round of the 1968 Major League Baseball draft. He began his professional career with the Magic Valley Cowboys of the Pioneer League, but was soon promoted to the Double-A Shreveport Braves.

McQueen missed most of the 1969 season, appearing in just four games for Shreveport. Despite this, he was chosen to start on October 2, the last game of the regular season, for the major league Braves. He pitched just three innings, giving up one run on two hits, walking three batters and striking out three. At age 19, he was the youngest player to appear in the major leagues that year.

The next season, McQueen started the year with the Triple-A Richmond Braves. He was again recalled to Atlanta in early June, where he was used out of the bullpen for most of the season. He was moved into the starting rotation in September, and his last appearance of the season was a complete game victory over the Reds.

In 1971, McQueen opened the season with Atlanta, again pitching mostly out of the bullpen. That spring, Hank Aaron compared McQueen to Warren Spahn Unfortunately, McQueen missed large chunks of the season to injury, appearing in just 17 games, winning four of them. That would turn out to be his career high.

McQueen suffered through another injury-plagued campaign in 1972, posting an 0–5 record in 23 games. He missed the entire 1973 season because of a hip dislocation resulting from a December 20, 1972 traffic collision near Uvalde, Texas. The automobile carrying McQueen and teammate Jim Breazeale was struck head-on by a car with a driver who attempted to pass a semi-trailer truck.

=== Remaining career ===
Working on a comeback in 1974, McQueen was taken off the Braves' 40-man roster. He was selected by the Reds from the Richmond Braves in the Rule 5 draft on December 3, 1973. He began the year in the Reds' bullpen. After appearing in 10 games and posting a 5.40 earned run average, McQueen was sent back to the Braves on July 1. He spent a month in Richmond, then was traded to the Baltimore Orioles on August 7 for a minor league pitcher. He appeared in just four more games that season.

McQueen was let go by the Orioles, and he sat out both the 1975 and 1976 seasons. In 1977, he decided to give baseball another chance, and he signed with the Houston Astros. He started out in A-ball with the Cocoa Astros, where he posted a 1.93 ERA in 28.1 innings, earning a promotion to Double-A Columbus. Things went downhill quickly, as he posted an ERA of 6.50 in 14 games, at which point he left professional baseball. Overall, from 1969 to 1974 McQueen appeared in 73 games as a pitcher, making 19 starts for the Braves and Reds.

McQueen died at age 67 in Batesville, Arkansas.
