= Spring Branch Independent School District =

School district in Harris County, Texas, United States

Spring Branch Independent School District Spring Branch ISD

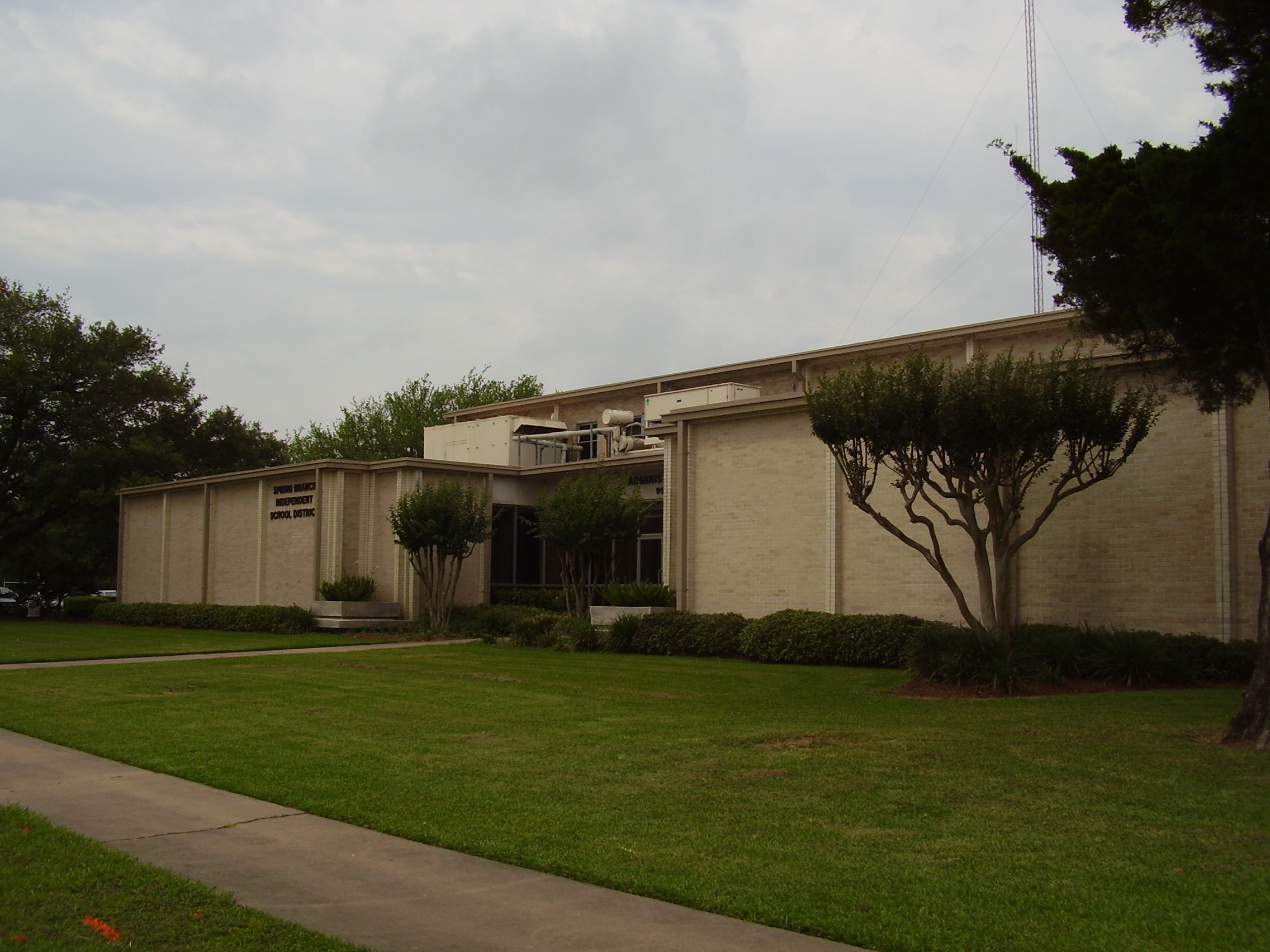
- SBISD administration building

Address
- 955 Campbell Road Houston, Harris, Texas, United States of America
- Coordinates: 29°46′56.5″N 95°30′52.5″W

District information
- Grades: PreK-12
- Superintendent: Jennifer Blaine
- NCES District ID: 4841100

Students and staff
- Students: 33,407 (2023–2024)
- Teachers: 2,149.15 (on an FTE basis) (2023–2024)
- Staff: 2,423.72 (on an FTE basis) (2023–2024)
- Student–teacher ratio: 15.54 (2023–2024)

Other information
- Website: springbranchisd.com

Spring Branch Independent School District is a school district headquartered in Hedwig Village, Texas, United States, in Greater Houston. The district serves portions of western Houston, including most of Spring Branch. It also serves several small municipalities known as the Memorial Villages in its jurisdiction, such as Hedwig Village and Spring Valley Village. A majority of the district lies within Houston city limits.

The school district's boundaries include Hempstead Road to the northeast (formerly US 290), Interstate 610 to the east, Clay Road to the north, the Addicks Dam to the west, and Buffalo Bayou to the south. Spring Branch serves 35,000 kindergarten through 12th grade students and includes a region with 188,000 residents.

The Spring Branch ISD area is served by the Houston City College System, but it is not within the tax base.

SBISD is not to be confused with the Spring Independent School District, also located in the Greater Houston area (the latter is located in the northern portion of the region).

There are currently four traditional high schools (grades 9–12), three of which are 6A, and one 5A high school, eight middle schools (grades 6–8), and twenty-four elementary schools (grades K-5), and four early education Pre-K centers in the district. Three more high school centers serve students in grades 9–12 with various purposes, including one public charter school.

In 2009, the school district was rated "academically acceptable" by the Texas Education Agency.

== History ==
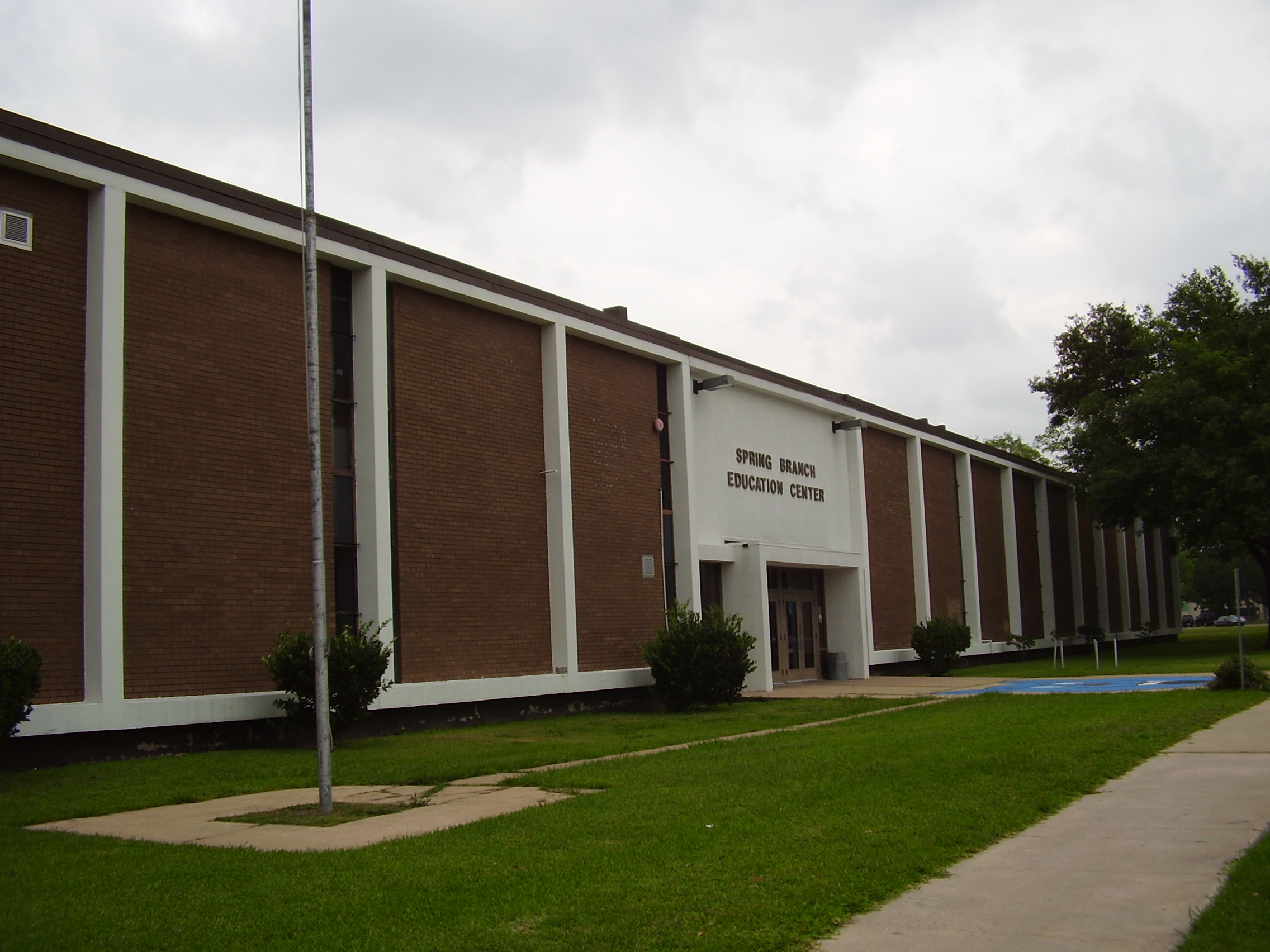
Spring Branch Education Center

The school district originated from the Spring Branch School Society, which was sponsored by the St. Peter's Church in 1856. The first school opened in 1889. By 1905, the white school had one teacher with 49 pupils and the black school had one teacher with 29 pupils.

The area did not become urban until the expansion of Houston city limits in the 1950s, which followed a failed attempt by the entire Spring Branch region to incorporate into a single entity, leading to the establishment of the Memorial Villages. Beginning in the mid-1950s and continuing through the mid-1970s, the school district expanded rapidly. By 1976, the school district had approximately 45,000 students.

In 1979, The New York Times said that the district was "highly regarded".

As the district moved into the 1980s, the number of students attending SBISD schools dropped precipitously, leaving a number of facilities underutilized. By the 1984–85 school year, the student population had dropped from its mid-1970s peak of over 40,000 to approximately 26,844. That year, the school board voted to consolidate certain schools at the end of school year, closing Spring Branch and Westchester Senior High Schools, along with Westchester and Northbrook Junior High Schools. (Northbrook Junior High School was later re-opened in 1991 as Northbrook Middle School. Northbrook Middle School was closed again in 2026.)

Hal Guthrie became superintendent in 1986 and retired in 2001. During Guthrie's term, an influx of Hispanic and low income students entered the district. By 2001, SBISD established free preschool for students at eligible lower income levels, as well as for students needing ESL or special education services. Melanie Markley of the Houston Chronicle wrote that Guthrie "not only guided the district back to health, but his retirement this year caps the end of a career that many say has earned Spring Branch a reputation as a trailblazer."

In 2009, SBISD began a partnership with Houston Community College Northwest, allowing students to take community college credit. Each student may earn up to 30 credits while enrolled at an SBISD school.

In 2015 two sections of Thornwood, two and three, currently served by the Katy Independent School District, proposed being removed from Katy ISD and placed in Spring Branch ISD, but both KISD and SBISD's boards denied the proposal.

== Governance ==
Spring Branch ISD is led by a Superintendent of Schools, Dr. Jennifer Blaine, Ed.D., chosen by the Board of Trustees, headed by President Chris Earnest. The board of trustees is elected by voters living in Spring Branch ISD.

In 2023 the board of education began requiring students to use restroom facilities for the gender they were assigned at birth.

== Student body ==
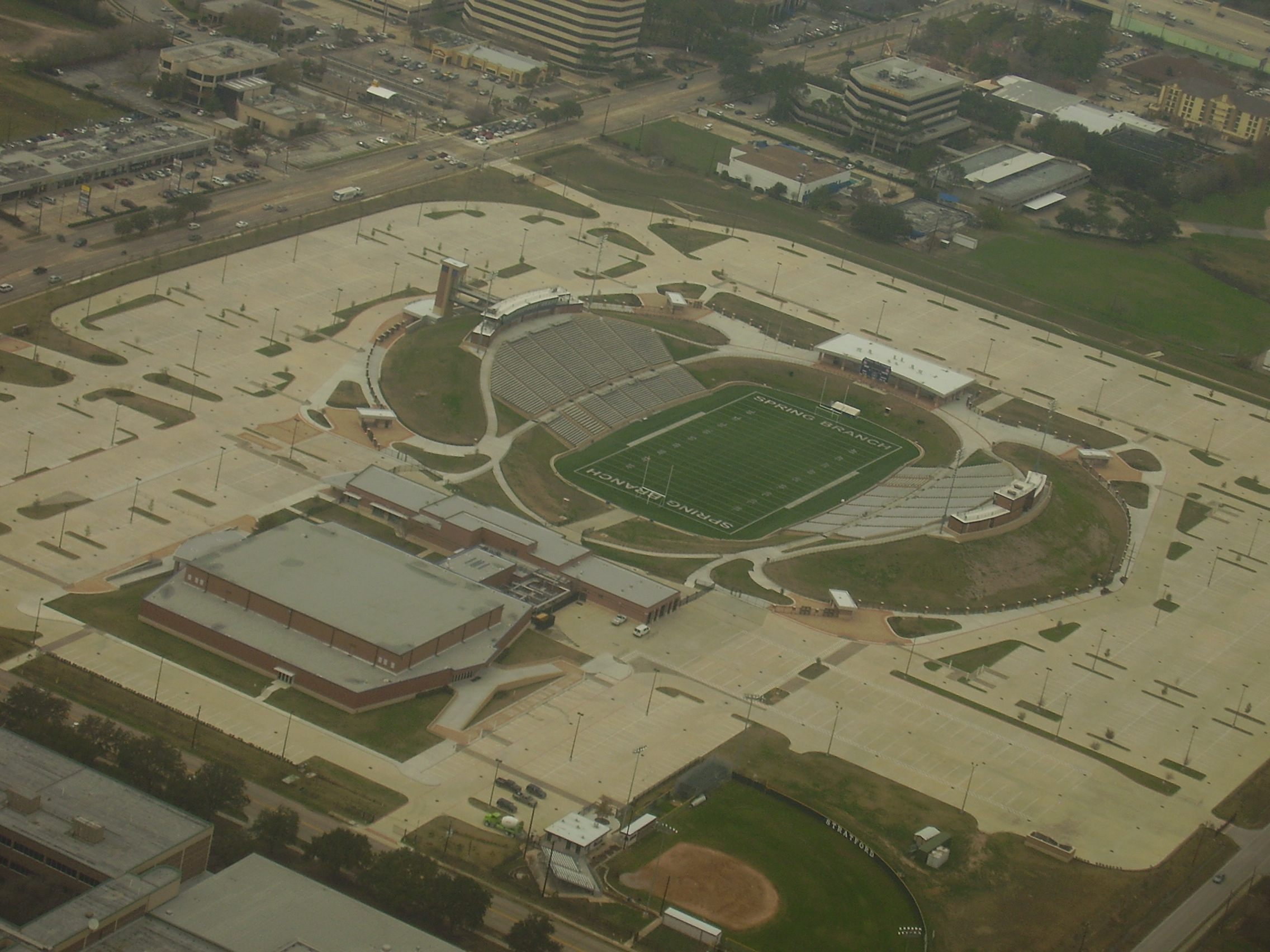
Tully Stadium, viewed by air

In 2001 SBISD had 32,000 students. SBISD's student body was 48% Hispanic, 39% White, 7% Asian, and 6% African American. By 2002 over half of the district's student body consisted of Hispanic and Latino Americans.

As of 2001, most students north of Interstate 10 are Hispanic and lower to middle income, while most students south of Interstate 10 are White and middle to upper income.

In 2008 it had 32,000 students.

In 2009 55% of SBISD students qualified for free or reduced lunch.

In 2018, SBISD had approximately 35,000 students.

== SBISD cities ==
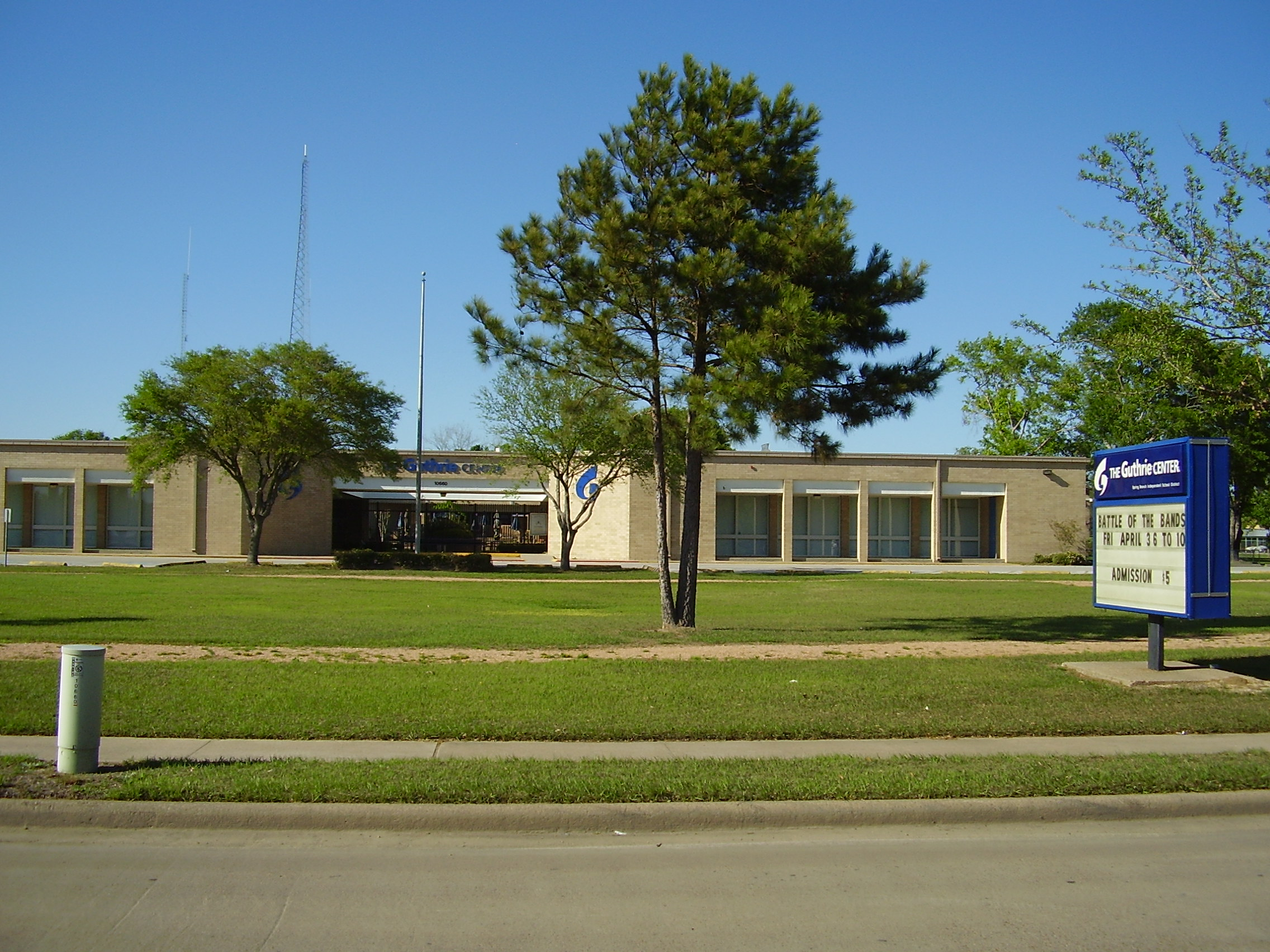
The Guthrie Center

SBISD covers all of the following cities:

- Bunker Hill Village
- Hedwig Village
- Hilshire Village
- Spring Valley Village

SBISD covers portions of the following cities:

- Houston (portions around the villages)
- Hunters Creek Village (areas north of Buffalo Bayou)
- Piney Point Village (areas north of Buffalo Bayou)

== Schools ==
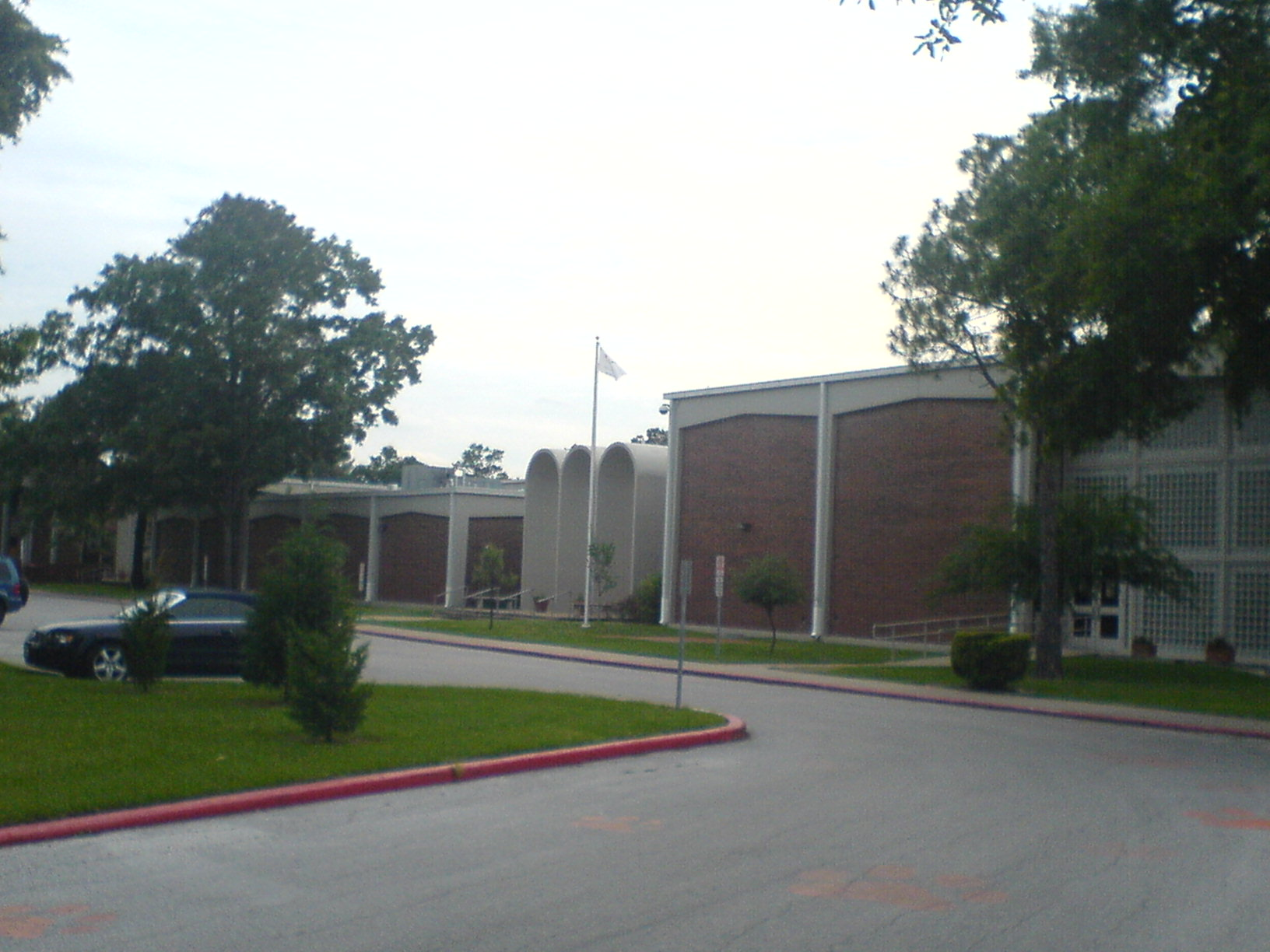
Westchester Academy for International Studies

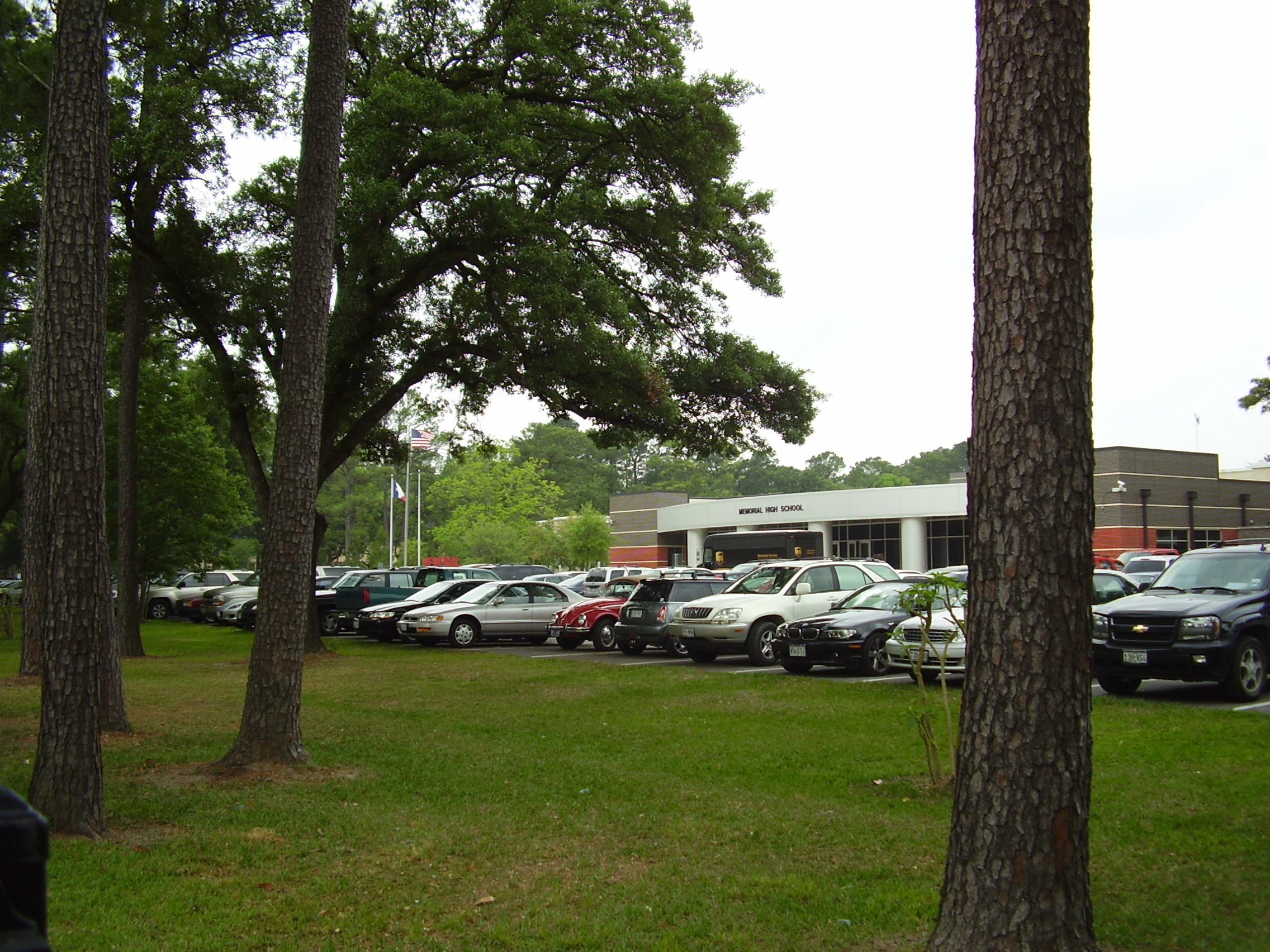
Memorial High School

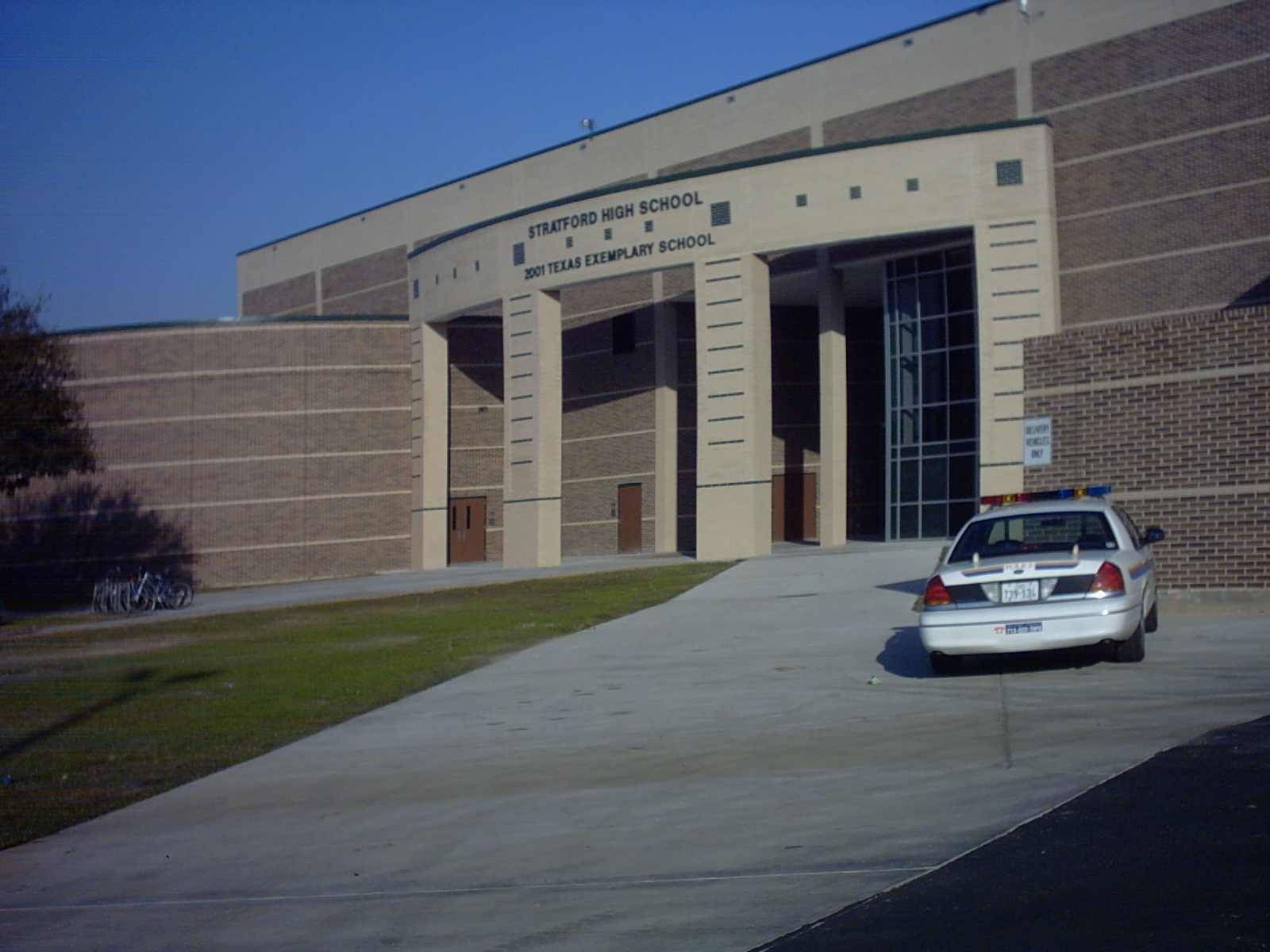
Stratford High School

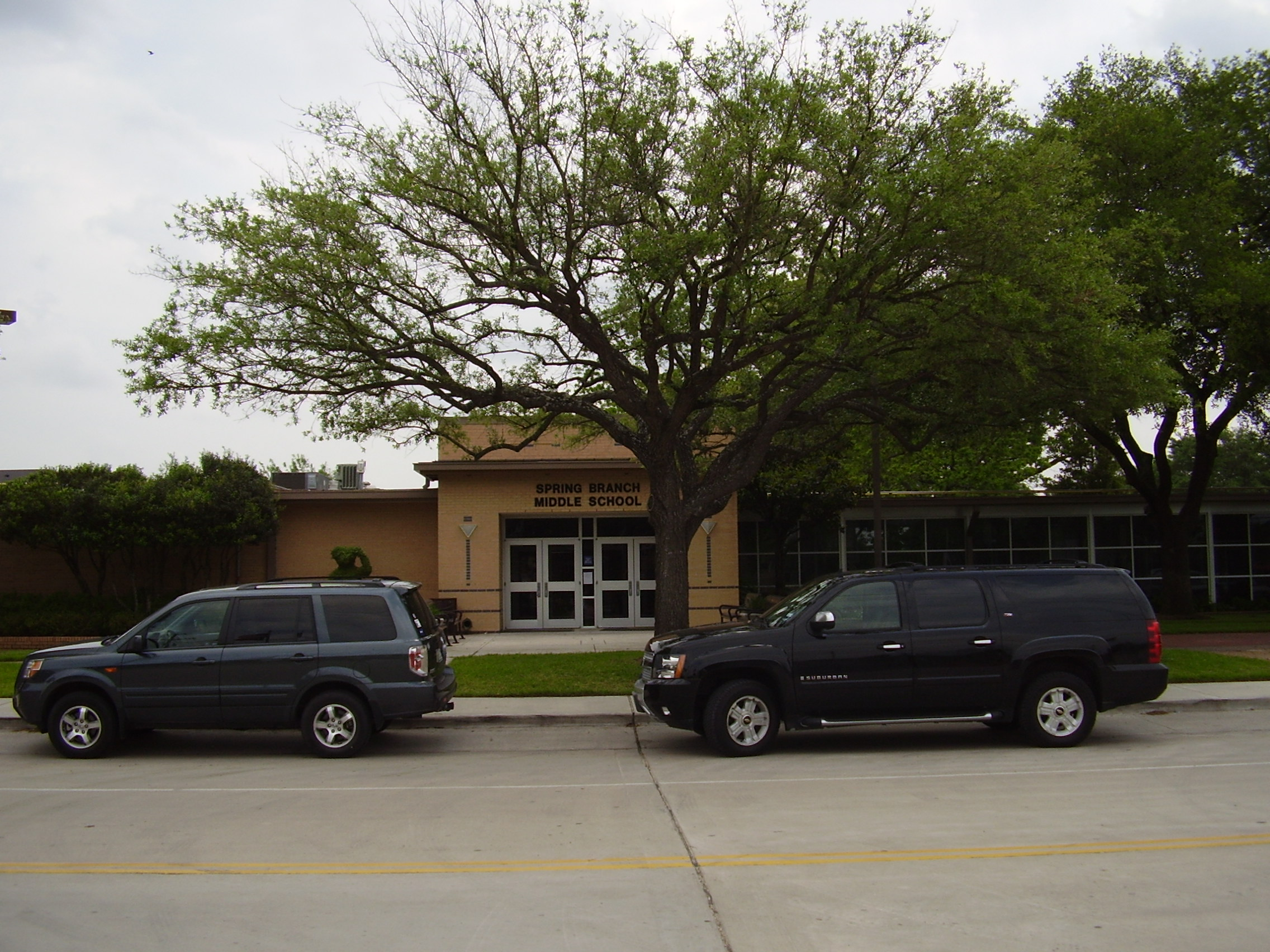
Spring Branch Middle School

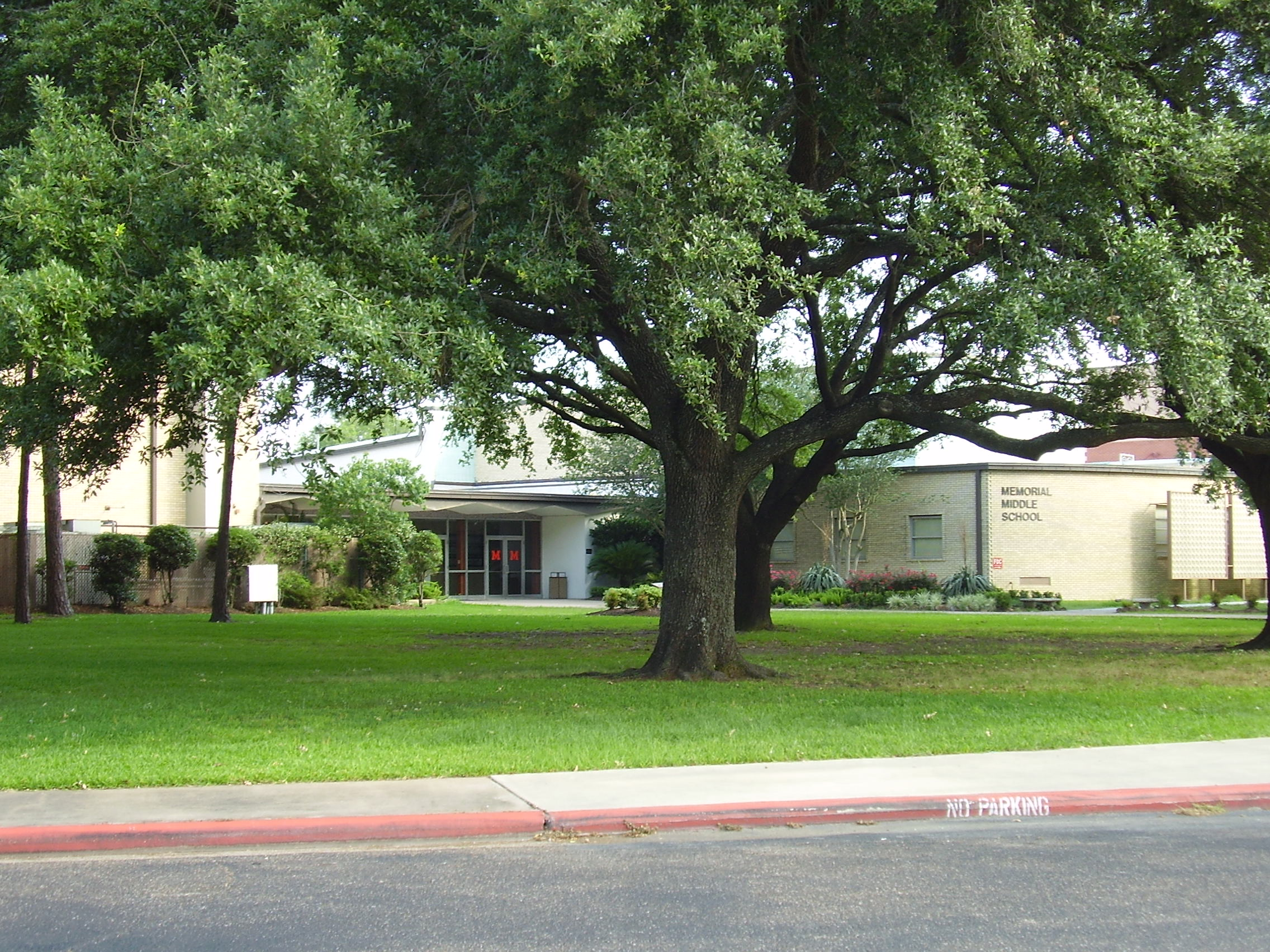
Memorial Middle School

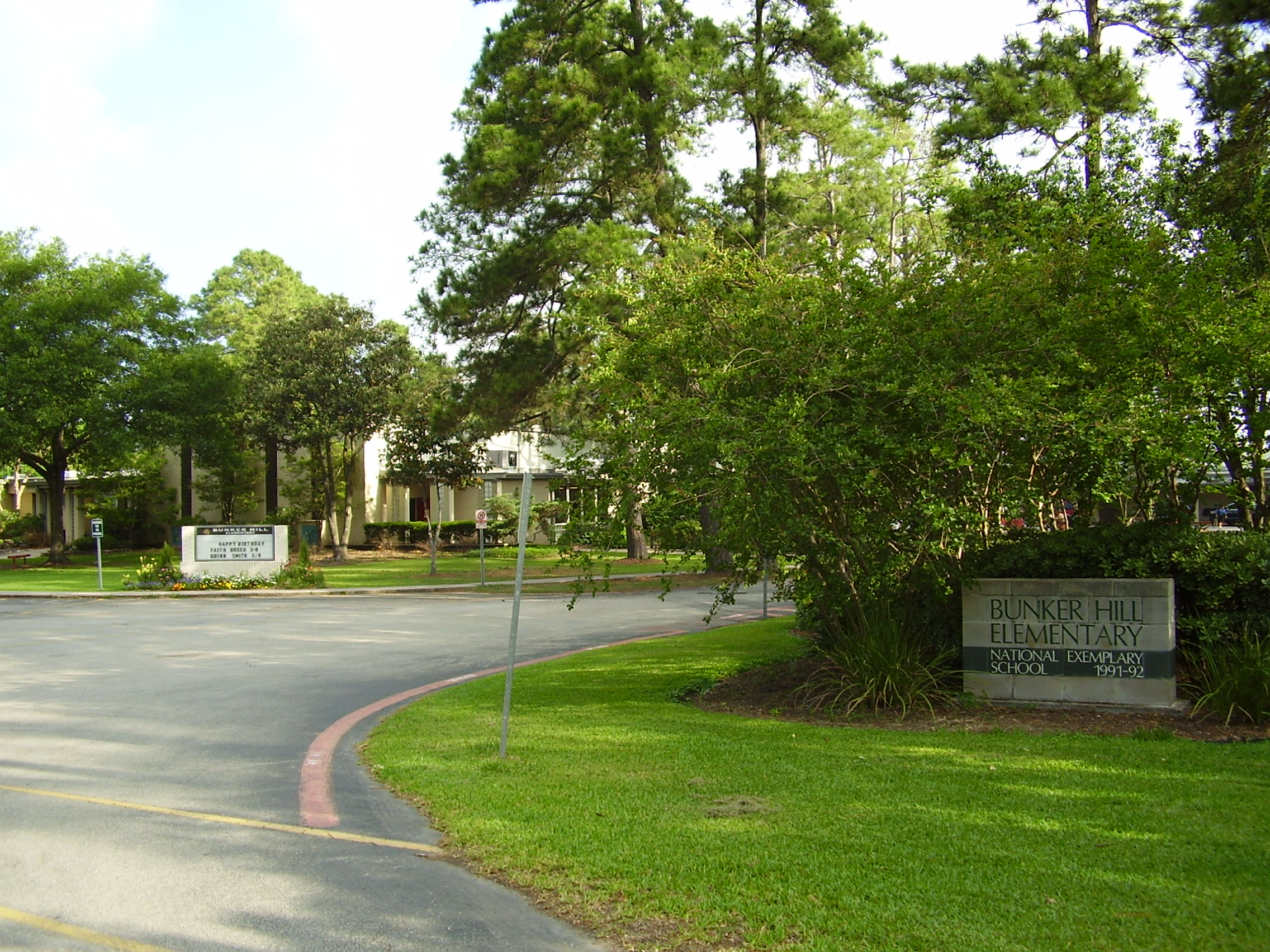
Bunker Hill Elementary School

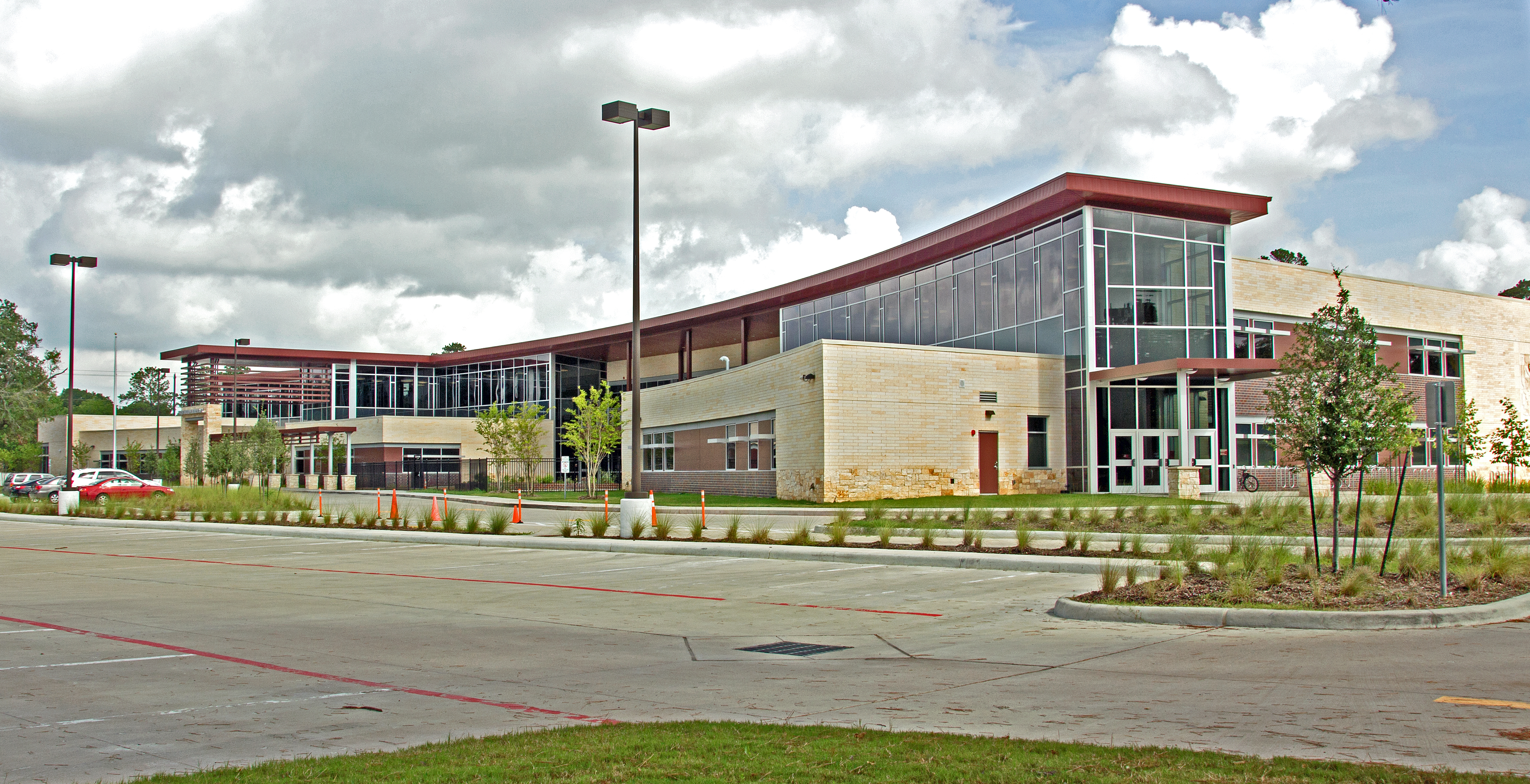
Frostwood Elementary School

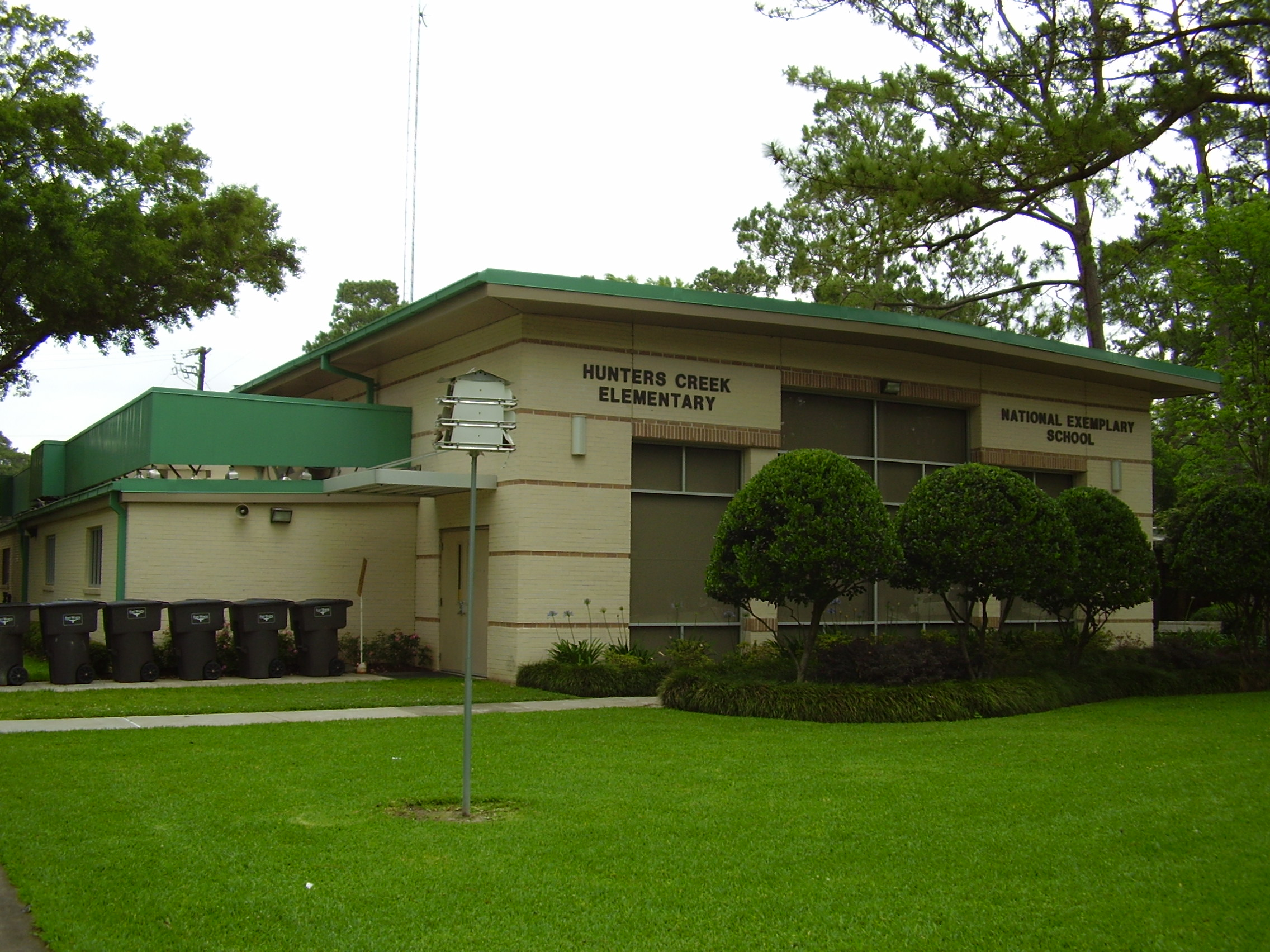
Hunters Creek Elementary School

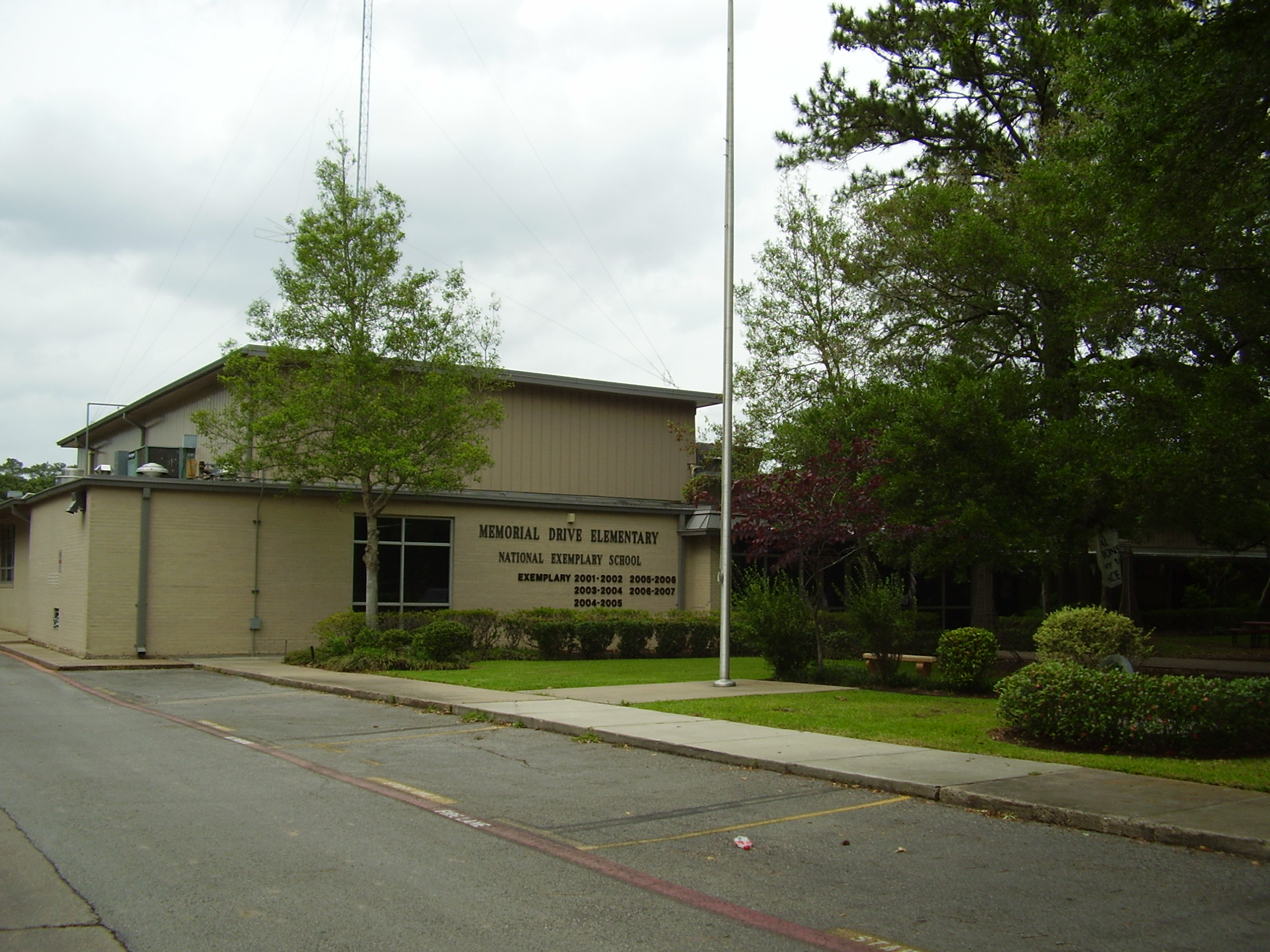
Memorial Drive Elementary School

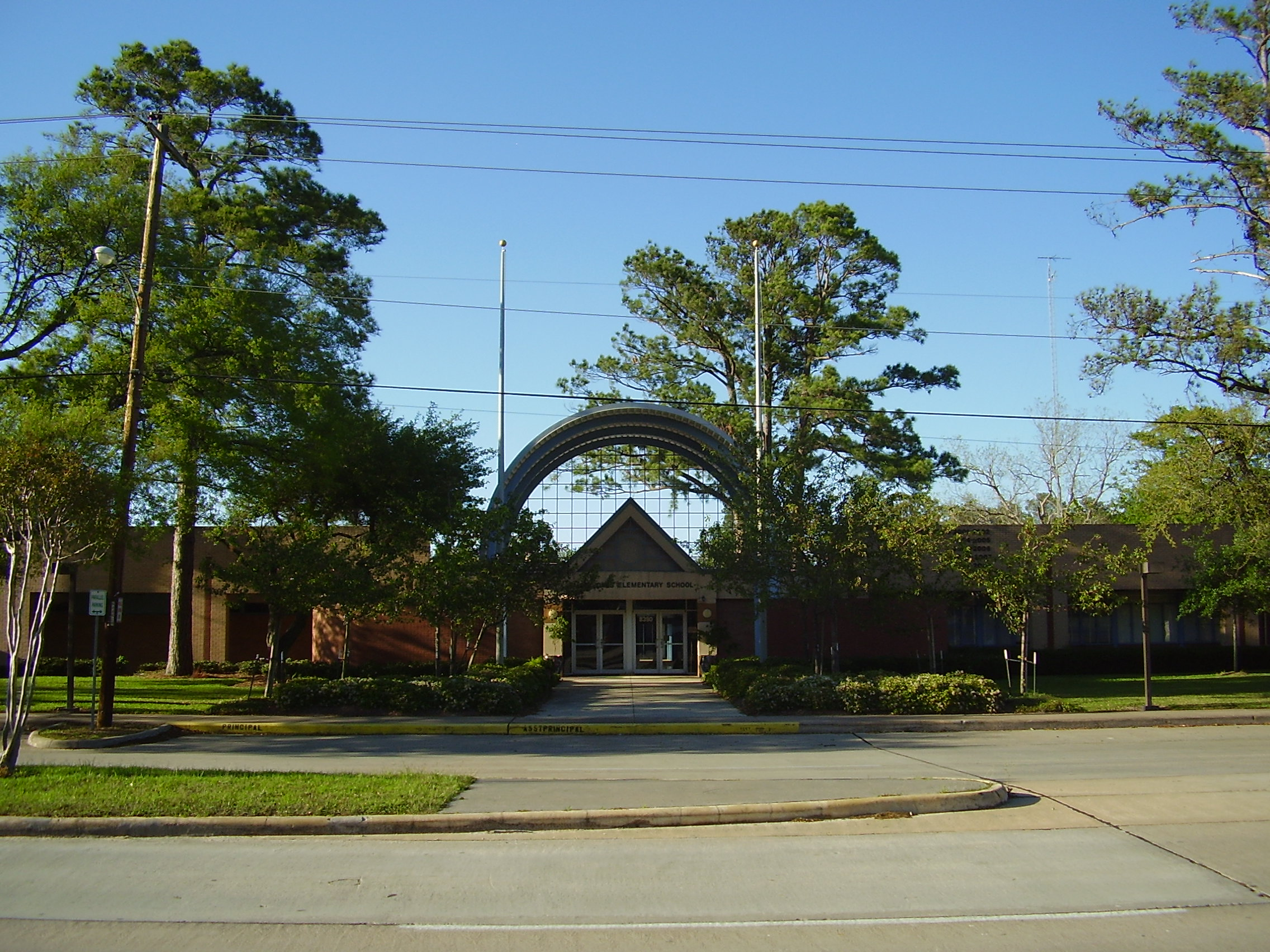
Valley Oaks Elementary School

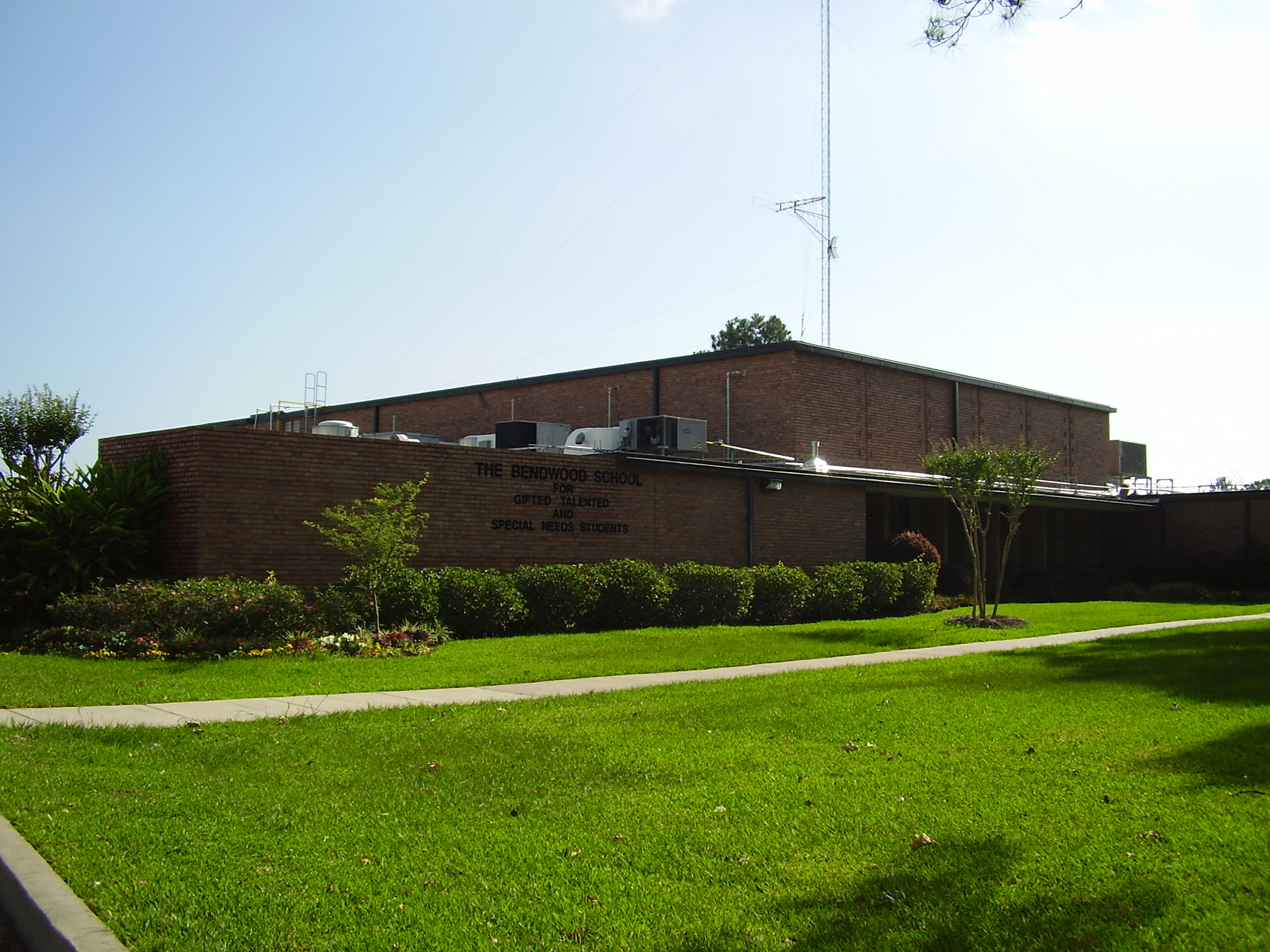
Bendwood Campus

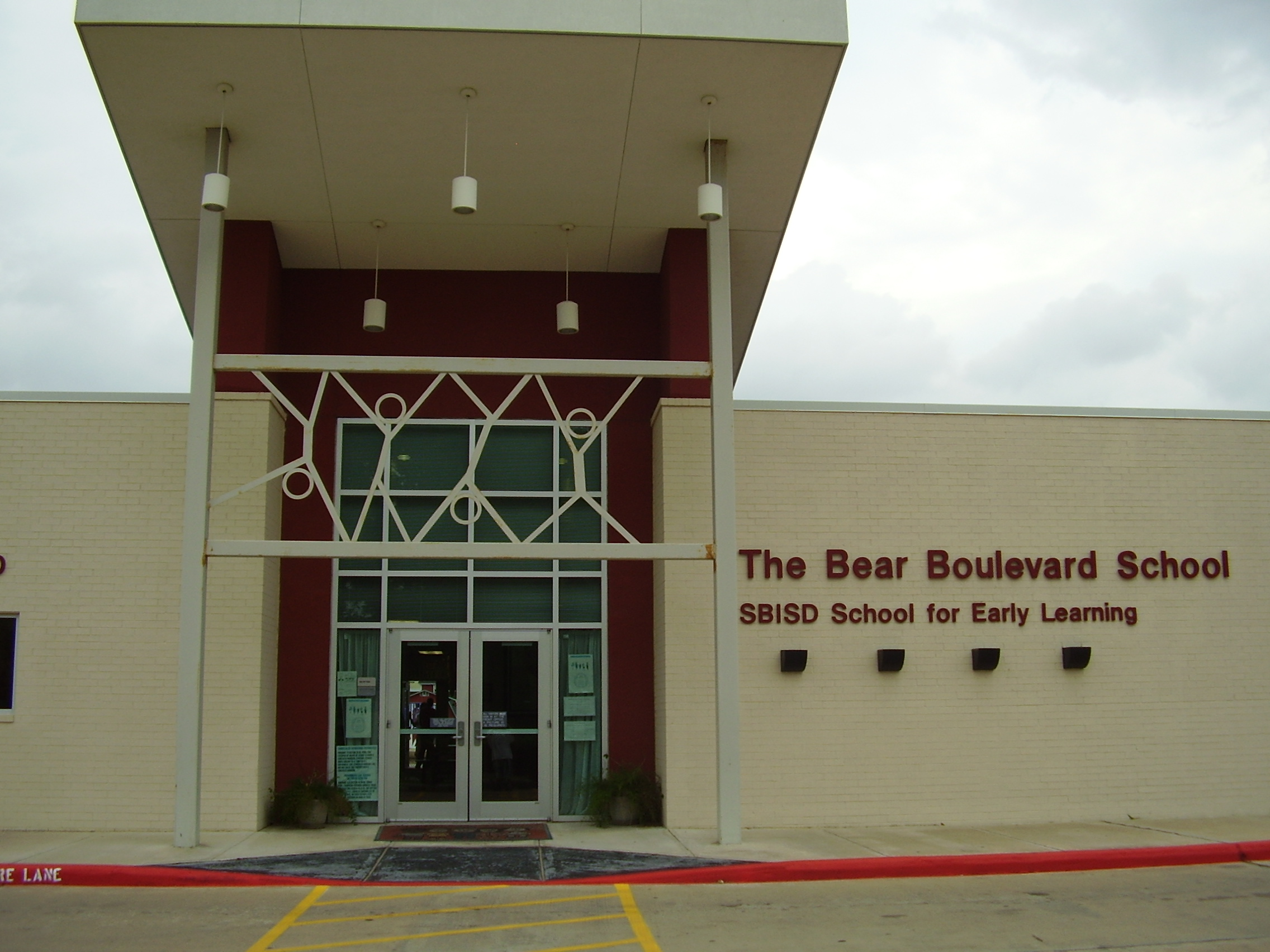
The Bear Boulevard School

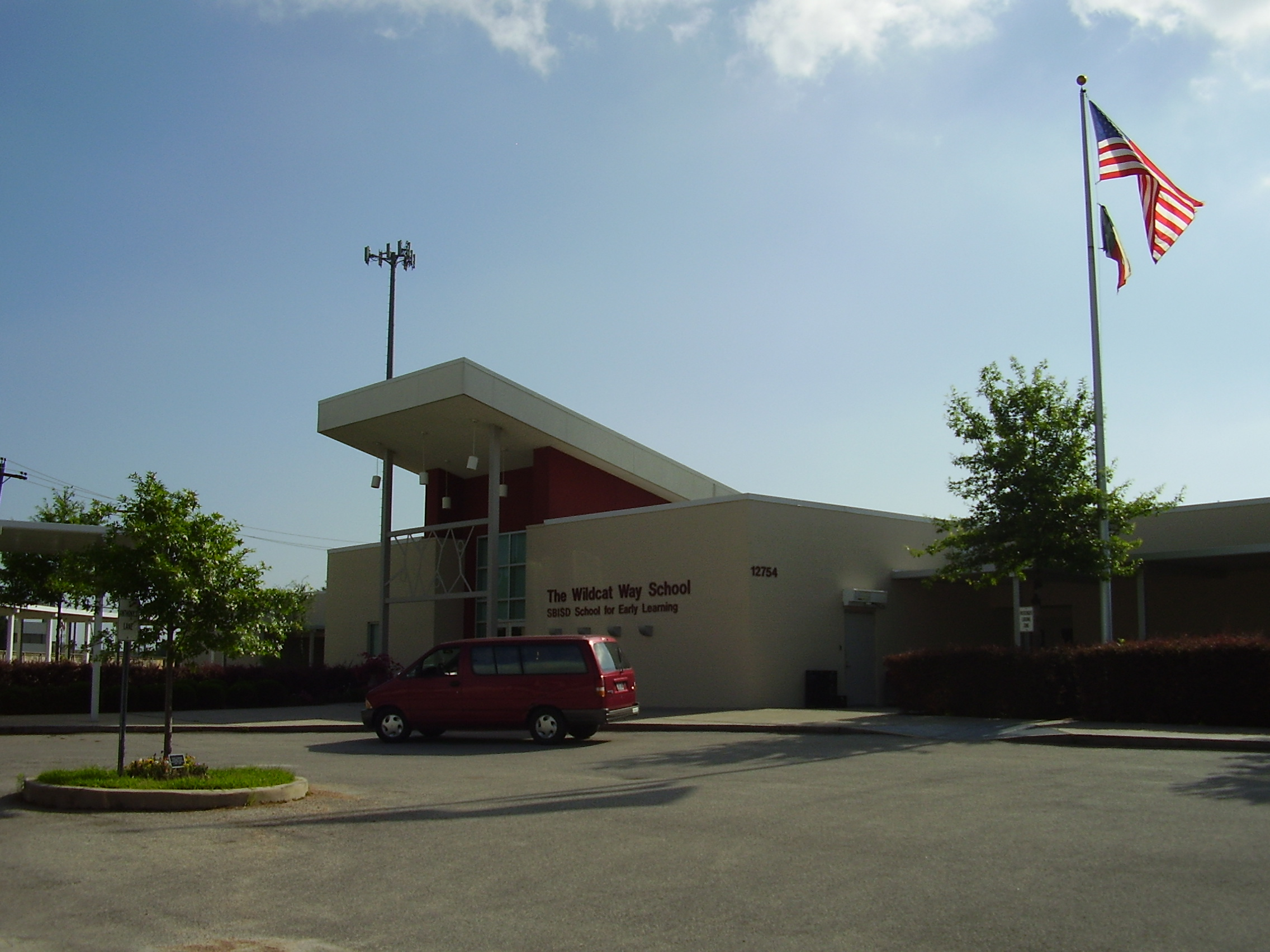
The Wildcat Way School

=== K-12 Schools ===
- Spring Branch Academic Institute (Houston, Choice)
  - Previously known as The Spring Branch School for Highly Gifted Students
  - The school uses Thornwood, Spring Forest Middle School, and Stratford High School as host campuses.

=== Secondary schools ===
6-12 Schools

- Phoenix Academy (Spring Valley Village, Choice)
  - The school uses Academy of Choice as a host campus.
- Westchester Academy for International Studies, home of the Wildcats (1964) (Houston, Choice)
  - National Blue Ribbon School in 2011-12
  - Campus was previously used to host Westchester High School.

High Schools

- Memorial High School, home of the Mustangs (1962) (Hedwig Village, Zoned)
- Northbrook High School, home of the Raiders (1974)(Houston, Zoned)
- Spring Woods High School, home of the Tigers (1964) (Houston, Zoned)
- Stratford High School, home of the Spartans (1974) (Houston, Zoned)
- Virtual High School
- YES Prep @ Northbrook High School (Houston, Charter)
  - The school closed effectively in 2024. The school used Northbrook High School as a host campus.

Middle Schools

- Cornerstone Academy (Spring Valley Village, Charter)
- KIPP Courage College Prep @ Landrum Middle School (Houston, Charter)
  - The school closed effective in 2024. The school used Landrum Middle School as a host campus.
- Landrum Middle School, home of the Lions (Formerly known as H.M. Landrum Jr. High School) (Houston, Zoned)
  - In 1956 the original Landrum campus opened. A groundbreaking ceremony for a new campus occurred on November 12, 2019, as part of a 2017 SBISD infrastructure bond. The new campus opened in June 2021 and held a ribbon cutting ceremony during the 2021–2022 academic school year cycle.
- Memorial Middle School (Houston, Zoned)
  - National Blue Ribbon School in 1988-89
- Northbrook Middle School, home of the Knights (Houston, Zoned)
  - National Blue Ribbon School in 1994-96
- Spring Branch Middle School (Hedwig Village, Zoned)
  - National Blue Ribbon School in 1997-98
- Spring Forest Middle School (Houston, Zoned)
  - National Blue Ribbon School in 1994-96
- Spring Oaks Middle School (Houston, Zoned)
  - National Blue Ribbon School in 1994-96
- Spring Woods Middle School (Houston, Zoned)
- YES Prep @ Northbrook Middle School (Houston, Charter)
  - The school closed effectively in 2024. The school used Northbrook Middle School as a host campus.

Other Schools

- The Guthrie Center (Formerly known as The Spring Branch Career Center) (Houston, Career & Technical Center)
- Dr. Hal Guthrie was a key figure in providing the vision and support for Career & Technical Education (CTE) programs throughout SBISD. Dr. Guthrie served as SBISD's Superintendent for sixteen years before his retirement in 2002. Dr. Hal Guthrie's years of service were recognized as the Spring Branch Career Center was renamed The Guthrie Center in 2003.
- Academy of Choice (Spring Valley Village, Alternative Education Campus)

=== Primary schools ===
Elementary schools

- Buffalo Creek Elementary School (Houston, Zoned)
- Bunker Hill Elementary School (Bunker Hill Village, Zoned)
  - 1991-92 National Blue Ribbon School
- Cedar Brook Elementary School (Houston, Zoned)
  - The current campus was built in 1992. A groundbreaking for its addition will be held on December 11, 2019, and the addition's scheduled opening is August 2021.
- Edgewood Elementary School (Houston, Zoned)
- Frostwood Elementary School (Bunker Hill Village, Zoned)
  - National Blue Ribbon School in 1989–90, 2005
- Hollibrook Elementary School (Houston, Zoned)
- Housman Elementary School (Houston, Zoned)
- Hunters Creek Elementary School (Hunters Creek Village, Zoned)
  - In 1954 the current Hunters Creek school opened. The district will open a new school building in August 2021. Its groundbreaking occurred on November 19, 2019.
  - National Blue Ribbon School in 1993-94
- Meadow Wood Elementary School (Houston, Zoned)
- Memorial Drive Elementary School (Piney Point Village, Zoned)
  - National Blue Ribbon School in 1996-97
  - The school is used regularly to host City Council meetings.
- Nottingham Elementary School (Houston, Zoned) - Located in Nottingham Forest VIII
  - National Blue Ribbon School in 1991-92
- Pine Shadows Elementary School (Houston, Zoned)
- Ridgecrest Elementary School (Houston, Zoned)
- Rummel Creek Elementary School (Houston, Zoned)
  - National Blue Ribbon School in 1985-86
- Shadow Oaks Elementary School (Houston, Zoned)
- Sherwood Elementary School (Houston, Zoned)
  - In 2007 Sherwood was the only SBISD school to get a Texas Education Agency ranking of "unacceptable." In 2008 it gained a "recognized" rating.
- Spring Branch Elementary School (Houston, Zoned)
  - In 1998 Spring Branch Elementary had a mostly Hispanic student body. During that year the Texas Education Agency ranked the school as "recognized." 55% of the students were exempted from taking the Texas Assessment of Knowledge and Skills (TAKS). 20% took the test, but their scores did not factor into the state's ranking since the students were new to the school district.
- Spring Shadows Elementary School (Houston, Zoned)
  - National Blue Ribbon School in 1996-97
- Terrace Elementary School (Houston, Zoned)
- Thornwood Elementary School (Houston, Zoned)
- Treasure Forest Elementary School (Houston, Zoned)
  - The school will close effective 2024.
- Valley Oaks Elementary School (Houston, Zoned)
- Westwood Elementary School (Houston, Zoned)
- Wilchester Elementary School (Houston, Zoned)
  - National Blue Ribbon School in 1989-90
- Woodview Elementary School (Houston, Zoned)

Other schools

- Bendwood School for GT and Special Ed Students (Houston)
  - Campus was previously used to host Bendwood Elementary School.

Pre-kindergarten schools

- Bear Boulevard School (Spring Valley Village)
- Early Childhood Collaborative
- Lion Lane School (Houston)
- Tiger Trail School (Houston)
- Wildcat Way School (Houston)

== Former schools ==
- Spring Branch High School (Became Cornerstone Academy/Spring Branch School of Choice.)
- Westchester Junior High (After closing, the school building was torn down in the 1990s to make way for an office building.)
- Westchester Senior High School (Served as a campus of Houston Community College before being reopened as Westchester Academy for International Studies.)
- Bendwood Elementary School (Now serves as the Bendwood School for GT students and special ed students)
- Northbrook Middle School

== See also ==
- List of school districts in Texas
