= Spring Valley Village, Texas =

City of Spring Valley Village
- City
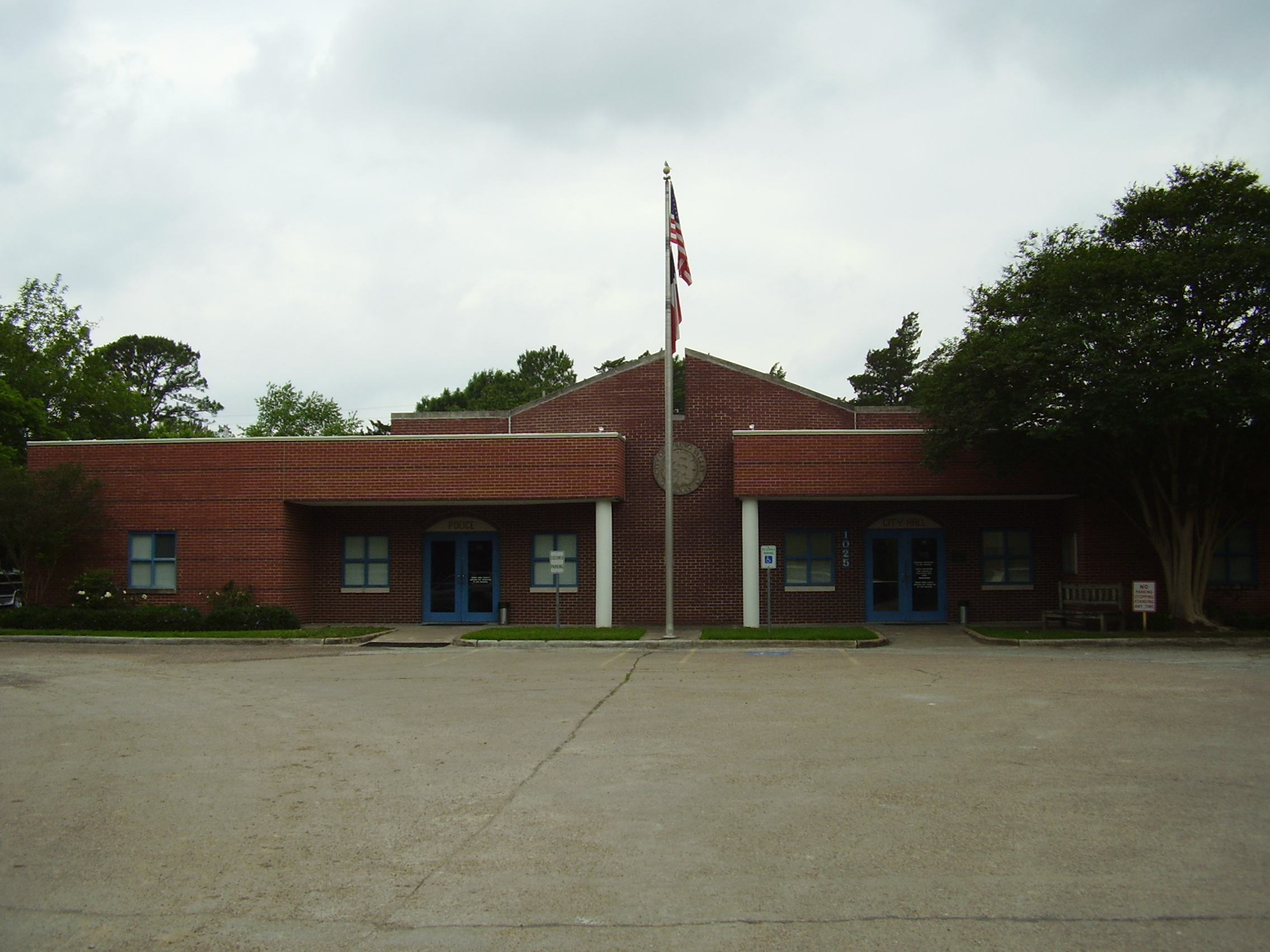
- Spring Valley Village City Hall

- Location in Harris County, Texas
- Coordinates: 29°47′23″N 95°30′17″W
- Country: United States
- State: Texas
- County: Harris

Government
  - Type: City Council
  - Mayor: Marcus Vajdos

Area
  - Total: 1.22 sq mi (3.15 km^{2})
  - Land: 1.22 sq mi (3.15 km^{2})
  - Water: 0 sq mi (0.00 km^{2})
- Elevation: 75 ft (23 m)

Population (2020)
  - Total: 4,229
  - Density: 3,553.4/sq mi (1,371.99/km^{2})
- Time zone: UTC-6 (Central (CST))
  - Summer (DST): UTC-5 (CDT)
- ZIP code: 77024 & 77055
- Area code: 713
- FIPS code: 48-69812
- GNIS feature ID: 1376280
- Website: www.springvalleytx.com

Spring Valley Village is a city in Harris County, Texas, United States, and an enclave of Houston. The population was 4,229 at the 2020 U.S. census.

== History ==
In 1936 state highway maps indicated a cemetery and a church. Initially the settlement consisted of one and one-half square miles.

In the mid-1950s, efforts to form a Spring Branch municipality (proposed to be called the city of Spring Branch in roughly the area known today as the Memorial Villages) failed. The city incorporated in 1955 as Spring Valley. There had been two elections for incorporation. The first result was against incorporation, and state law mandated that the next election for incorporation of the same boundary would have to be held at least one year later. Some advocates of incorporation convinced Robert R. Casey, then a Harris county judge, to modify the boundary of the proposed area by removing the Campbell Place area and therefore many voters who opposed incorporating. The following election, held on April 9, 1955, was in favor of incorporation, 183 for and 165 against. Because of the 1955 incorporation, Houston did not incorporate Spring Valley's territory into its city limits, while Houston annexed surrounding areas that were unincorporated. In 1960 the city had 3,004 residents and two businesses. The city had 3,800 residents in 1976 and 3,392 residents in 1990.

In 2007, the name of the city was officially changed from Spring Valley to Spring Valley Village. Regardless of the name change, all postal addresses in Spring Valley Village are Houston-based.

== Geography ==
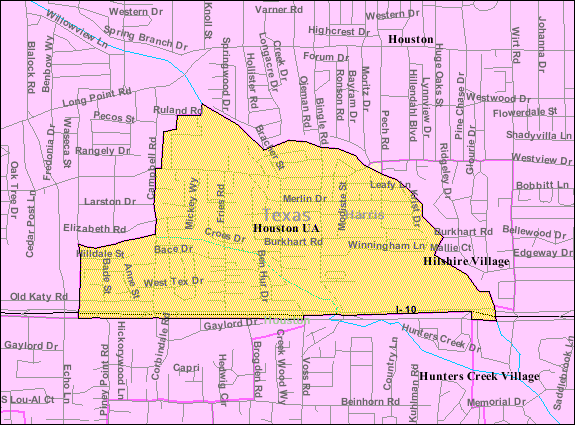
Location of Spring Valley Village

According to the United States Census Bureau, the city has a total area of 1.3 square miles (3.4 km^{2}), all land. The city is surrounded by Houston, Hilshire Village, and Hunters Creek.

== Demographics ==
Historical population
Census	Pop.	Note	%±
1960	3,004		—
1970	3,170		5.5%
1980	3,353		5.8%
1990	3,392		1.2%
2000	3,611		6.5%
2010	3,715		2.9%
2020	4,229		13.8%
U.S. Decennial Census

=== Racial and ethnic composition ===
Spring Valley Village city, Texas – Racial and ethnic composition Note: the US Census treats Hispanic/Latino as an ethnic category. This table excludes Latinos from the racial categories and assigns them to a separate category. Hispanics/Latinos may be of any race.
Race / Ethnicity (NH = Non-Hispanic)	Pop 2000	Pop 2010	Pop 2020	% 2000	% 2010	% 2020
White alone (NH)	3,294	3,163	3,231	91.22%	85.14%	76.40%
Black or African American alone (NH)	12	33	27	0.33%	0.89%	0.64%
Native American or Alaska Native alone (NH)	16	6	8	0.44%	0.16%	0.19%
Asian alone (NH)	107	187	370	2.96%	5.03%	8.75%
Native Hawaiian or Pacific Islander alone (NH)	1	0	0	0.03%	0.00%	0.00%
Other race alone (NH)	2	9	30	0.06%	0.24%	0.71%
Mixed race or Multiracial (NH)	23	31	135	0.64%	0.83%	3.19%
Hispanic or Latino (any race)	156	286	428	4.32%	7.70%	10.12%
Total	3,611	3,715	4,229	100.00%	100.00%	100.00%

=== 2020 census ===
As of the 2020 census, there were 4,229 people, 1,421 households, and 1,242 families residing in the city. The median age was 42.6 years, 28.4% of residents were under the age of 18, and 15.4% were 65 years of age or older. For every 100 females there were 96.7 males, and for every 100 females age 18 and over there were 93.9 males age 18 and over.

100.0% of residents lived in urban areas, while 0.0% lived in rural areas.

There were 1,421 households in Spring Valley Village, of which 46.1% had children under the age of 18 living in them. Of all households, 76.8% were married-couple households, 7.7% were households with a male householder and no spouse or partner present, and 13.9% were households with a female householder and no spouse or partner present. About 13.0% of all households were made up of individuals and 7.6% had someone living alone who was 65 years of age or older.

There were 1,478 housing units, of which 3.9% were vacant. The homeowner vacancy rate was 0.7% and the rental vacancy rate was 7.9%.

=== 2010 census ===
At the census of 2010, there were 3,715 people, 1,368 households, and 1,099 families residing in the city. The racial makeup of the city by population was 3,445 White, 218 Asian, 36 African American, 16 Native American, 1 Pacific Islander, 43 from other races, and 11 from two or more races, and 286 Hispanic or Latino of any race.

There were 1,368 households, out of which 476 had children under the age of 18 living with them, 964 were married couples living together, 100 had a female householder with no husband present, and 269 were non-families. 243 households were made up of individuals, and 126 had someone living alone who was 65 years of age or older. The average household size was 2.72 and the average family size was 3.09.

In the city, the population was spread out, with 2,671 over the age of 18 and 469 who were 65 years of age or older. The median age was 43.4 years.

== Government and infrastructure ==
As of 2026, the mayor of Spring Valley Village is David Dominy. The 5 city council members are Steve Bass, Allen Carpenter, John Lisenby, Joy McCormack, and Mark Taylor. Former mayor is Marcus Vajdos.

Board of Adjustment Members are William Featherston, Chris Kuhman, Lance Lee, Sharon Smith, and Blane Vincent.

Parks & Greenspace Board Members are Jocelyn Vincent, Michael Pokorski, Jay Beasley, Paul Bunch, PJ Laxmidas, Barbara Sterbanz, and Mark Uffhausen.

Planning and Zoning Board Members are Trey Hoffman, Jarrad Bourger, Priscilla Blossom, Nathan Carroll, Brad Jones, Jerry Kent, and Elijio Serrano.

Spring Valley Village Police Department is a 24-hour law enforcement agency that provides services to the City of Spring Valley Village. As of 2016, the department employs 32 persons: 26 sworn Texas Peace Officers and 6 Telecommunication Officers. The City of Spring Valley Village was recognized as the safest city in Harris County in 2019 (per Houston Chronicle survey). The Police Department was recognized by the Texas Police Chiefs Association as a recognized agency in early 2020.

Spring Valley Village is located in District 133 of the Texas House of Representatives. Jim Murphy represents the district. Spring Valley Village is within District 17 of the Texas Senate, which is currently represented by Joan Huffman.

Spring Valley Village is in Texas's 7th congressional district; in 2008, the publication Human Events identified ZIP code 77024 as the ZIP code that gave the eighth largest contribution to John McCain's 2008 US presidential election campaign. The SIP code, which includes Hedwig Village, had given $540,309 by October 24, 2008. As of 2019, however, the 7th congressional district is represented by a Democrat, Lizzie Pannill Fletcher.

Harris Health System (formerly Harris County Hospital District) designated Northwest Health Center for ZIP code 77055. The nearest public hospital is Ben Taub General Hospital in the Texas Medical Center.

== Politics ==
In the 2016 presidential election, Spring Valley Village went to Republican nominee Donald Trump with 1,593 votes (65%) while Democratic nominee Hillary Clinton received 718 votes (29%). In the 2020 presidential election, Spring Valley Village tallied 1,723 votes (63%) for Republican nominee Trump and 992 votes (36%) for Democratic nominee Joe Biden. In the 2024 presidential election, Republican nominee Trump garnered 1,637 votes (61%) in Spring Valley Village to Democratic nominee Kamala Harris's 969 votes (36%).

== Fire service ==
The Village Fire Department serves all of the Memorial Villages.

Village Fire building and vehicles

== Education ==
=== Primary and secondary schools ===
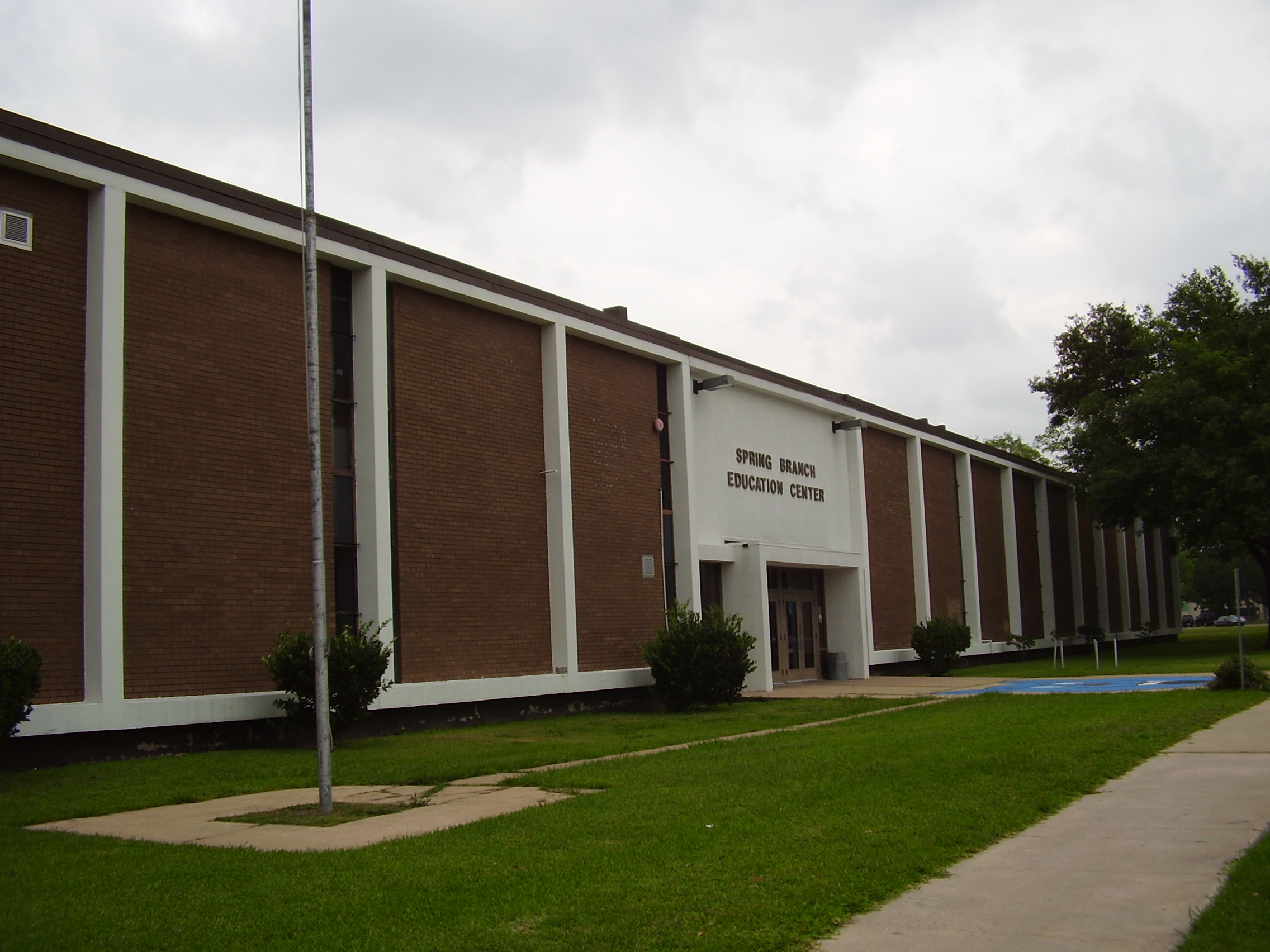
Spring Branch Education Center, housing the Spring Branch School of Choice and the Cornerstone Academy

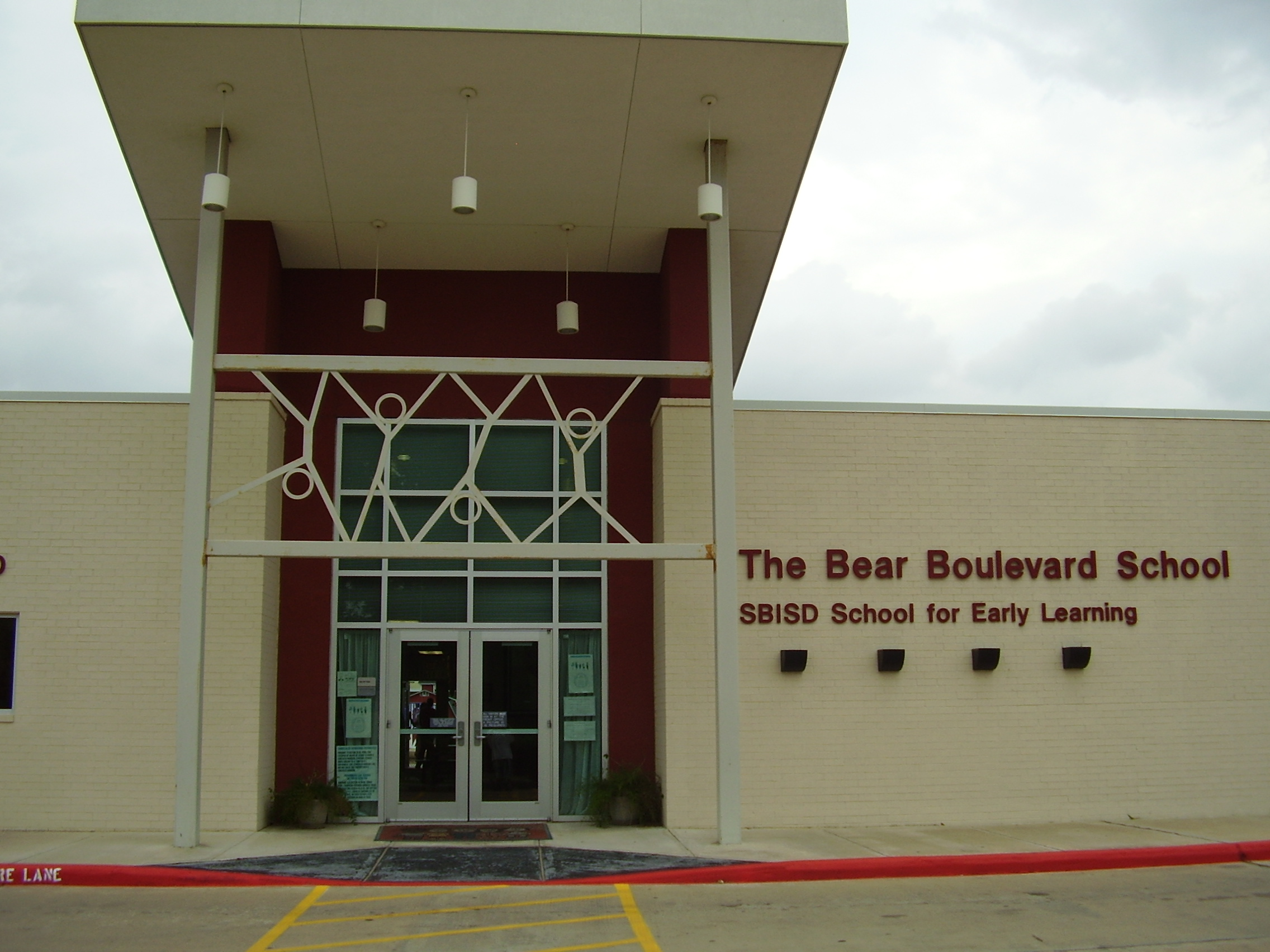
Bear Boulevard School (Pre-K)

Spring Valley Village is served by the Spring Branch Independent School District.

Spring Valley Village is zoned to Bear Boulevard School in Spring Valley Village, Valley Oaks Elementary School in Spring Branch, Houston, Spring Branch Middle School in Hedwig Village, and Memorial High School in Hedwig Village.

Spring Branch School of Choice and Cornerstone Academy are located in Spring Valley Village.

=== Colleges and universities ===
Spring Branch ISD (and therefore Spring Valley Village) is served by the Houston Community College System.

== Public libraries ==
The Harris County Public Library (HCPL) system operates the Spring Branch Memorial Branch at 930 Corbindale Road in the City of Hedwig Village. The 10,500-square-foot (980 m^{2}) branch opened in 1975. Ring Library is the closest Houston Public Library location.

== Media ==
The Houston Chronicle is the metropolitan newspaper. The Memorial Examiner is a local newspaper distributed in the community. Several other local magazines are distributed in the area including Buzz, Greet Memorial, and SB+.

"Love's Embrace," a statue of Pam Lychner and her daughters at Spring Valley Village City Hall

== Notable person ==
- Pam Lychner, a Spring Valley Village real estate agent who promoted the Pam Lychner Sexual Offender Tracking and Identification Act of 1996 after an assault in a vacant house. After Lychner and her daughters died on TWA Flight 800, Congress passed the bill. The City of Spring Valley Village posted a statue of Lychner and her daughters at the city hall. After the statue was posted, visitors read the plaques, left roses, and touched the bronze. Lisa Gray of the Houston Press described it as "shamelessly emotional, a monument to a secular saint and her daughters."
