= Hilshire Village, Texas =

City of Hilshire Village
- City
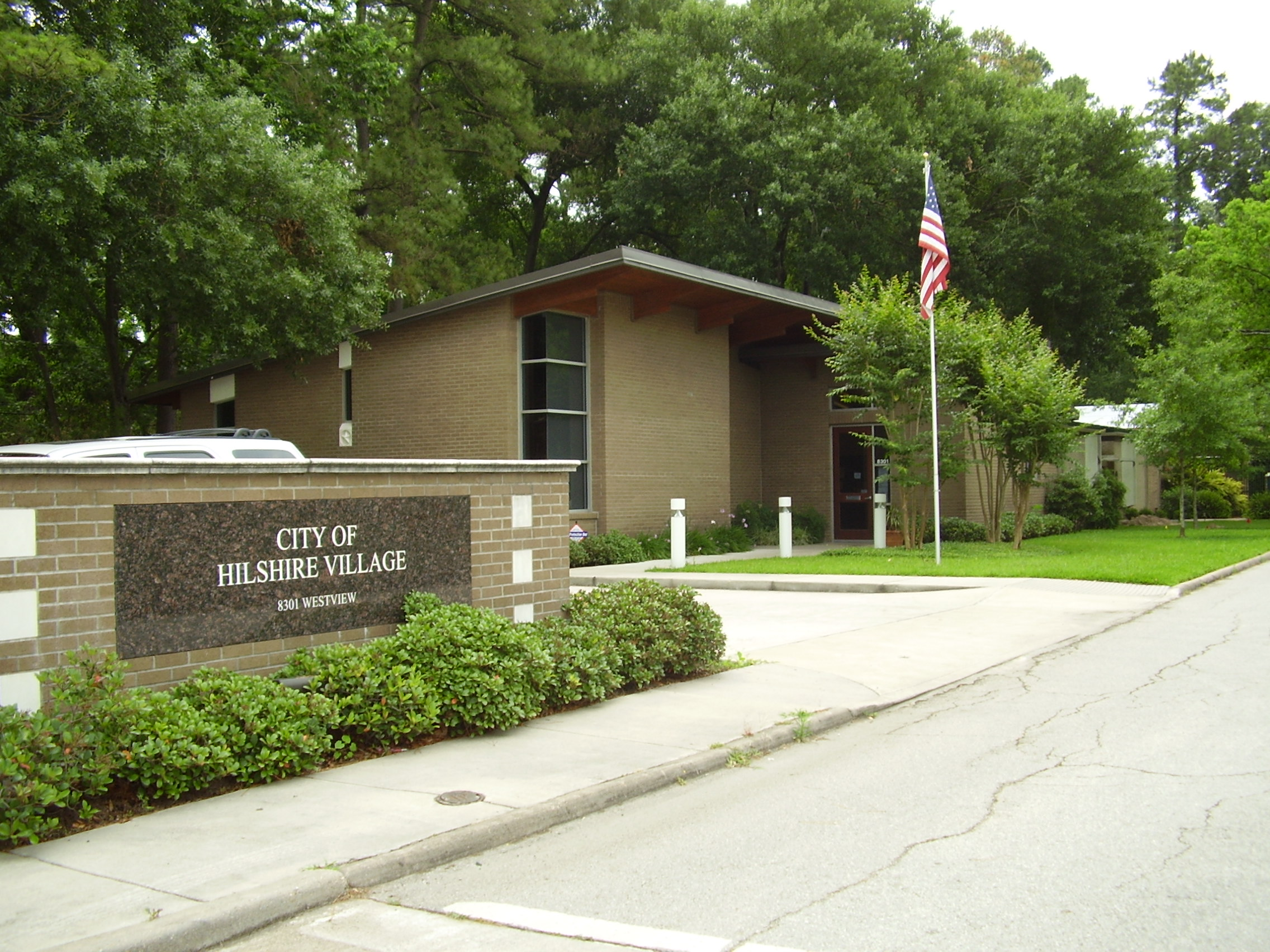
- Hilshire Village City Hall

- Location in Harris County and the state of Texas
- Coordinates: 29°47′25″N 95°29′17″W
- Country: United States
- State: Texas
- County: Harris

Area
  - Total: 0.27 sq mi (0.69 km^{2})
  - Land: 0.27 sq mi (0.69 km^{2})
  - Water: 0 sq mi (0.00 km^{2})
- Elevation: 69 ft (21 m)

Population (2020)
  - Total: 816
  - Density: 3,021.2/sq mi (1,166.48/km^{2})
- Time zone: UTC-6 (Central (CST))
  - Summer (DST): UTC-5 (CDT)
- ZIP code: 77055
- Area code: 713
- FIPS code: 48-34148
- GNIS feature ID: 1374079
- Website: www.hilshirevillagetexas.com

Hilshire Village is a city in Harris County, Texas, United States. The population was 816 at the 2020 census. The city is the smallest of the Memorial Villages in terms of area.

As of 2000, Hilshire Village was the 10th wealthiest location in Texas by per capita income.

== History ==
In the 1940s, Frank Bruess and his mother left Missouri, entered Texas, and purchased 30 acres (120,000 m^{2}) of land in their new state. Bruess read about a country estate in Hillshire, England; he liked this name and called his development "Hilshire Village" with one "L." By the early 1950s, construction of Hilshire Village began.

In the mid-1950s, effort to form a Spring Branch municipality failed. Hilshire Village incorporated on April 15, 1955. Because of the 1955 incorporation, Houston did not incorporate Hilshire Village's territory into its city limits, while Houston annexed surrounding areas that were unincorporated. In 1960 543 people lived in Hilshire Village. In 1970, 627 residents lived in Hilshire Village. By the 1990s, the population grew to 665 residents. During that period, some people demolished older homes and replaced them with newer homes.

== Geography ==
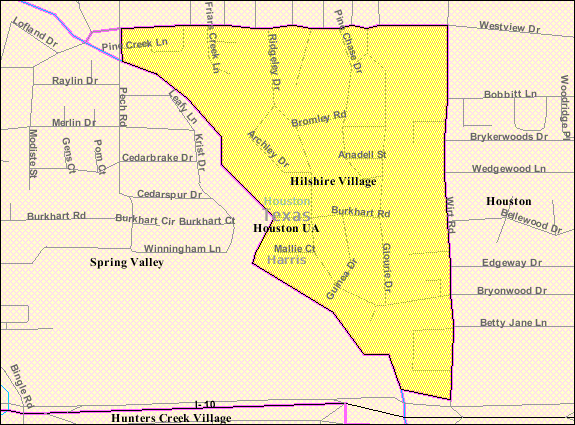
Map of Hilshire Village, Texas

Hilshire Village is located at 29°47′25″N 95°29′17″W (29.790394, –95.488178).

According to the United States Census Bureau, the city has a total area of 0.3 square miles (0.78 km^{2}), all land.

== Demographics ==
Historical population
Census	Pop.	Note	%±
1960	543		—
1970	627		15.5%
1980	621		−1.0%
1990	665		7.1%
2000	720		8.3%
2010	746		3.6%
2020	816		9.4%
U.S. Decennial Census; 1850–1900 1910; 1920 1930 1940; 1950 1960 1970; 1980 1990 2000; 2010

=== Racial and ethnic composition ===
Hilshire Village city, Texas – Racial and ethnic composition Note: the US Census treats Hispanic/Latino as an ethnic category. This table excludes Latinos from the racial categories and assigns them to a separate category. Hispanics/Latinos may be of any race.
Race / Ethnicity (NH = Non-Hispanic)	Pop 2000	Pop 2010	Pop 2020	% 2000	% 2010	% 2020
White alone (NH)	648	635	610	90.00%	85.12%	74.75%
Black or African American alone (NH)	3	2	21	0.42%	0.27%	2.57%
Native American or Alaska Native alone (NH)	1	1	4	0.14%	0.13%	0.49%
Asian alone (NH)	24	42	69	3.33%	5.63%	8.46%
Native Hawaiian or Pacific Islander alone (NH)	0	0	0	0.00%	0.00%	0.00%
Other race alone (NH)	3	0	0	0.42%	0.00%	0.00%
Mixed race or Multiracial (NH)	11	17	22	1.53%	2.28%	2.70%
Hispanic or Latino (any race)	30	49	90	4.17%	6.57%	11.03%
Total	720	746	816	100.00%	100.00%	100.00%

=== 2020 census ===
As of the 2020 census, there were 816 people and 274 families residing in the city, and the median age was 48.3 years. 24.9% of residents were under the age of 18 and 22.4% of residents were 65 years of age or older. For every 100 females there were 104.5 males, and for every 100 females age 18 and over there were 101.6 males age 18 and over.

100.0% of residents lived in urban areas, while 0.0% lived in rural areas.

There were 291 households in Hilshire Village, of which 46.0% had children under the age of 18 living in them. Of all households, 75.6% were married-couple households, 8.9% were households with a male householder and no spouse or partner present, and 13.4% were households with a female householder and no spouse or partner present. About 11.3% of all households were made up of individuals and 6.6% had someone living alone who was 65 years of age or older.

There were 298 housing units, of which 2.3% were vacant. The homeowner vacancy rate was 0.0% and the rental vacancy rate was 29.2%.

Racial composition as of the 2020 census
Race	Number	Percent
White	617	75.6%
Black or African American	21	2.6%
American Indian and Alaska Native	4	0.5%
Asian	70	8.6%
Native Hawaiian and Other Pacific Islander	0	0.0%
Some other race	12	1.5%
Two or more races	92	11.3%
Hispanic or Latino (of any race)	90	11.0%

=== 2000 census ===
As of the census of 2000, there were 720 people, 286 households, and 227 families residing in the city. The population density was 2,661.0 inhabitants per square mile (1,027.4/km^{2}). There were 292 housing units at an average density of 1,079.2 per square mile (416.7/km^{2}). The racial makeup of the city was 93.89% White, 0.42% African American, 0.14% Native American, 3.33% Asian, 0.42% from other races, and 1.81% from two or more races. Hispanic or Latino of any race were 4.17% of the population.

There were 286 households, out of which 33.6% had children under the age of 18 living with them, 69.9% were married couples living together, 6.6% had a female householder with no husband present, and 20.3% were non-families. 17.1% of all households were made up of individuals, and 11.9% had someone living alone who was 65 years of age or older. The average household size was 2.52 and the average family size was 2.83.

In the city, the population was spread out, with 24.0% under the age of 18, 2.1% from 18 to 24, 21.9% from 25 to 44, 34.3% from 45 to 64, and 17.6% who were 65 years of age or older. The median age was 46 years. For every 100 females, there were 89.5 males. For every 100 females age 18 and over, there were 86.7 males.

The median income for a household in the city was $117,252, and the median income for a family was $129,025. Males had a median income of $90,402 versus $61,875 for females. The per capita income for the city was $66,620. About 3.0% of families and 2.5% of the population were below the poverty line, including 4.1% of those under age 18 and 2.6% of those age 65 or over.

== Government and infrastructure ==
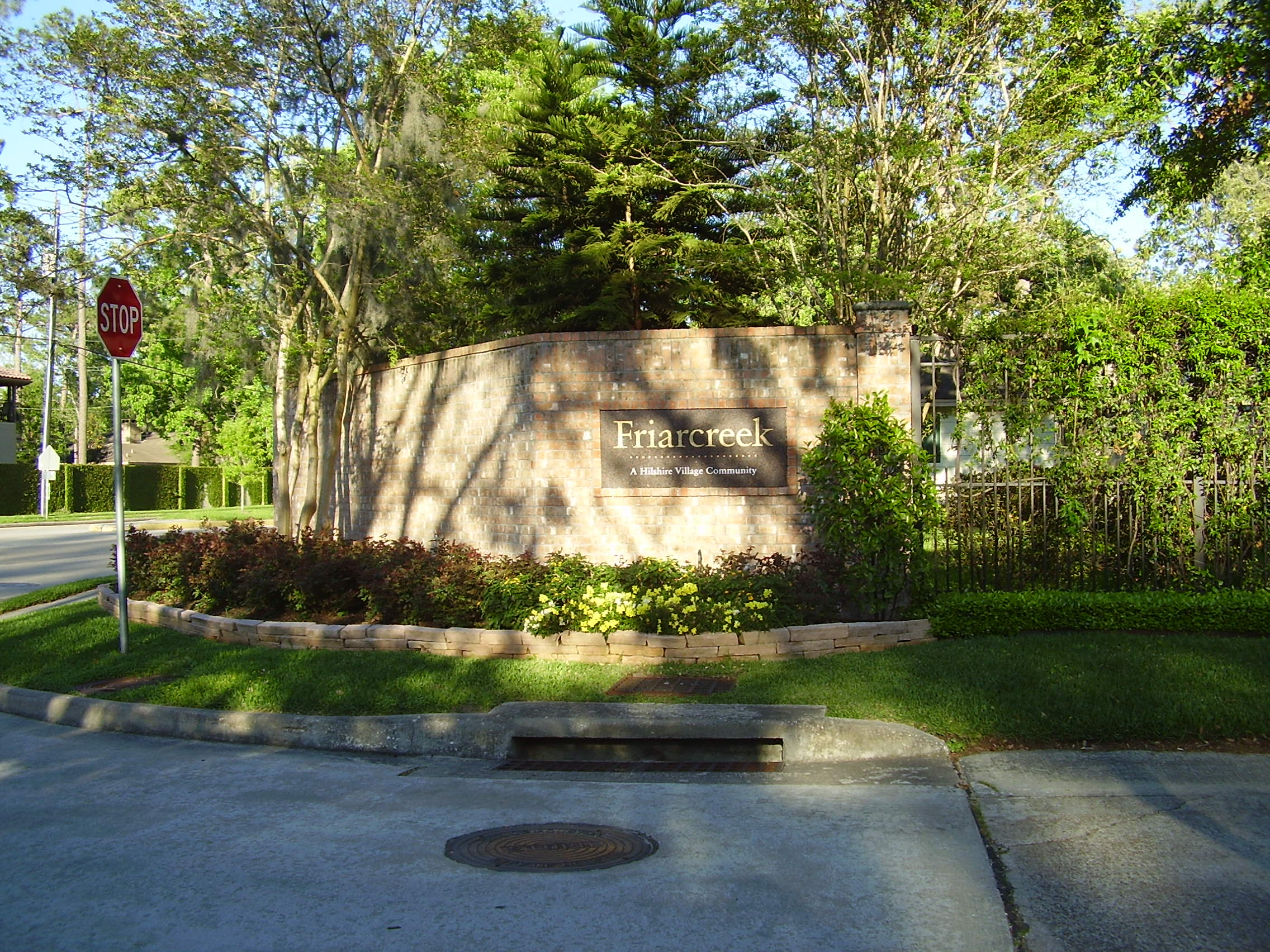
Friarcreek, a community in Hilshire Village

The city has a mayor-council form of government. The Village Fire Department serves all of the Memorial villages.

The Spring Valley Police Department serves Hilshire Village.

Harris County Precinct Three, headed by Tom Ramsey as of 2022, serves Hilshire Village.

Hilshire Village is located in Texas House of Representatives, District 133 of the Texas House of Representatives. As of 2022 Jim Murphy represents the district. Hilshire Village is within District 17 of the Texas Senate; as of 2022 Joan Huffman represents the district.

Hilshire Village is in Texas's 7th congressional district; as of 2022, Democrat Lizzie Pannill Fletcher is the representative.

The United States Postal Service uses "Houston" for all Hilshire Village addresses; "Hilshire Village" is not an acceptable city designation for mail addressed to areas in Hilshire Village .

Harris Health System (formerly Harris County Hospital District) designated Northwest Health Center for ZIP code 77055. The nearest public hospital is Ben Taub General Hospital in the Texas Medical Center.

== Politics ==
In the 2016 presidential election, Hilshire Village went to Republican nominee Donald Trump with 300 votes (62%) while Democratic nominee Hillary Clinton received 157 votes (32%). In the 2020 presidential election, Hilshire Village tallied 331 votes (59%) for Republican nominee Trump and 228 votes (40%) for Democratic nominee Joe Biden. In the 2024 presidential election, Republican nominee Trump garnered 314 votes (60%) in Hilshire Village to Democratic nominee Kamala Harris's 201 votes (38%).

== Education ==
=== Primary and secondary schools ===
==== Public schools ====
Hilshire Village is served by Spring Branch Independent School District. Hilshire Village is zoned to Bear Boulevard School in Spring Valley Village, Valley Oaks Elementary School in Spring Branch, Houston, Spring Branch Middle School in Hedwig Village, and Memorial High School in Hedwig Village.

==== Private schools ====
School of the Woods is located in Hilshire Village. and one of the two campuses of The Monarch School were previously there, but the school planned to move out of its Hilshire Village campus and its campus in the Houston city limits into a new campus in the Houston city limits in August 2008.

The Roman Catholic Archdiocese of Galveston-Houston operates St. Cecilia School, a K–8 Roman Catholic school, in nearby Hedwig Village. The Kinkaid School, a K–12 private school, is located in Piney Point Village.

=== Colleges and universities ===
Spring Branch ISD (and therefore Hilshire Village) is served by the Houston Community College System. The Northwest College operates the nearby Spring Branch Campus in Houston.

=== Public libraries ===
It is served by the Spring Branch Memorial Branch of Harris County Public Library (the Spring Branch Memorial Branch is in Hedwig Village).

== Media ==
The Houston Chronicle is the area regional newspaper.

The Memorial Examiner is a local newspaper distributed in the community.

== Postal services ==
The closest United States Postal Service location is the Long Point Post Office at 8000 Long Point Road, Houston, Texas, 77055-9998.
