= Pam Lychner State Jail =

Jail in Atascocita, Texas, United States

Pam Lychner State Jail (Formerly Atascocita State Jail)
- Interactive map of Pam Lychner State Jail (Formerly Atascocita State Jail)
- Location: 2350 Atascocita Road, Humble, Texas (postal address), 77396; 29.957560°N 95.222440°W
- Status: Operational
- Security class: J1-J5, G1, G2, Transient
- Capacity: 2,276
- Opened: 1995
- Former name: Atascocita State Jail
- Managed by: TDCJ Correctional Institutions Division
- Warden: Bobby Rigsby
- Website: https://www.tdcj.texas.gov/unit_directory/aj.html

Pam Lychner State Jail (AJ) known as the Atascocita State Jail until 1996, is a Texas Department of Criminal Justice (TDCJ) state jail for men located in Atascocita, unincorporated northeast Harris County, Texas, United States It is 20 miles (32 km) northeast of Downtown Houston.

In July 1995, the jail, initially the Atascocita State Jail, opened. After Pam Lychner, a victim's rights activist, died on board TWA Flight 800 with her daughters on July 17, 1996, the Texas Board of Criminal Justice (TBCJ) unanimously voted to rename the facility to Pam Lychner State Jail.

The Pam Lychner State Jail currently serves low risk, medium risk, high risk, and high security Inmates. The Lychner Jail also serves state jail Inmates from Harris County.

A statue of Lychner and her daughters is located outside of the state jail grounds.
