= Jim Breazeale =

American baseball player (1949–2025)

- First baseman
- Born: October 3, 1949; Houston, Texas, U.S.
- Died: March 13, 2025 (aged 75); Bay City, Texas, U.S.
- Batted: Left Threw: Right

MLB debut
- September 13, 1969, for the Atlanta Braves

Last MLB appearance
- July 19, 1978, for the Chicago White Sox

MLB statistics
- Batting average: .223
- Home runs: 9
- Runs batted in: 33
- Stats at Baseball Reference

Teams
- Atlanta Braves (1969, 1971–1972); Chicago White Sox (1978)

James Leo Breazeale Jr. (October 3, 1949 – March 13, 2025) was an American professional baseball first baseman. Standing 6 feet 2 inches (1.88 m) tall and weighing 210 pounds (95 kg), he batted left-handed and threw right-handed. He played in Major League Baseball (MLB) for the Atlanta Braves and Chicago White Sox.

== Biography ==
Breazeale was a highly regarded amateur player at Sam Houston High School in Houston and drew comparisons to fellow Houstonian Rusty Staub.

Breazeale was drafted by the Atlanta Braves with the eighth pick of the first round of the January 1968 Major League Baseball Draft. He played four seasons in the Major Leagues, three with the Braves (1969; 1971–1972), and one for the Chicago White Sox (1978).

Breazeale began the 1973 season on the disabled list until early June because of an ankle fracture resulting from a December 20, 1972 traffic collision near Uvalde, Texas. The automobile carrying Breazeale and teammate Mike McQueen was struck head-on by a car with a driver who attempted to pass a semi-trailer truck. Prior to the accident, he had been expected to become the starting first baseman, allowing Hank Aaron to play the outfield again.

In his MLB career, Breazeale played 89 games with 179 at bats and 40 hits. He had three home runs, 33 RBIs, 20 runs, and a .223 batting average. He played his final game on July 19, 1978 with the White Sox.

Breazeale's heart failed in 2021, and he began using a left ventricular assist device. He died on March 13, 2025, at the age of 75.
