= Spring Branch School of Choice =

Spring Branch School of Choice (Academy of Choice)

Location
- 9016 Westview Drive; Spring Valley Village, Texas; United States
- Coordinates: 29.798042°N 95.510722°W

Information
- Type: Public school
- Founded: 1985
- Director: Michele Hillberth
- Enrollment: 153 (2015-16)
- Campus: Urban
- Color(s): Blue, White
- Mascot: Bear

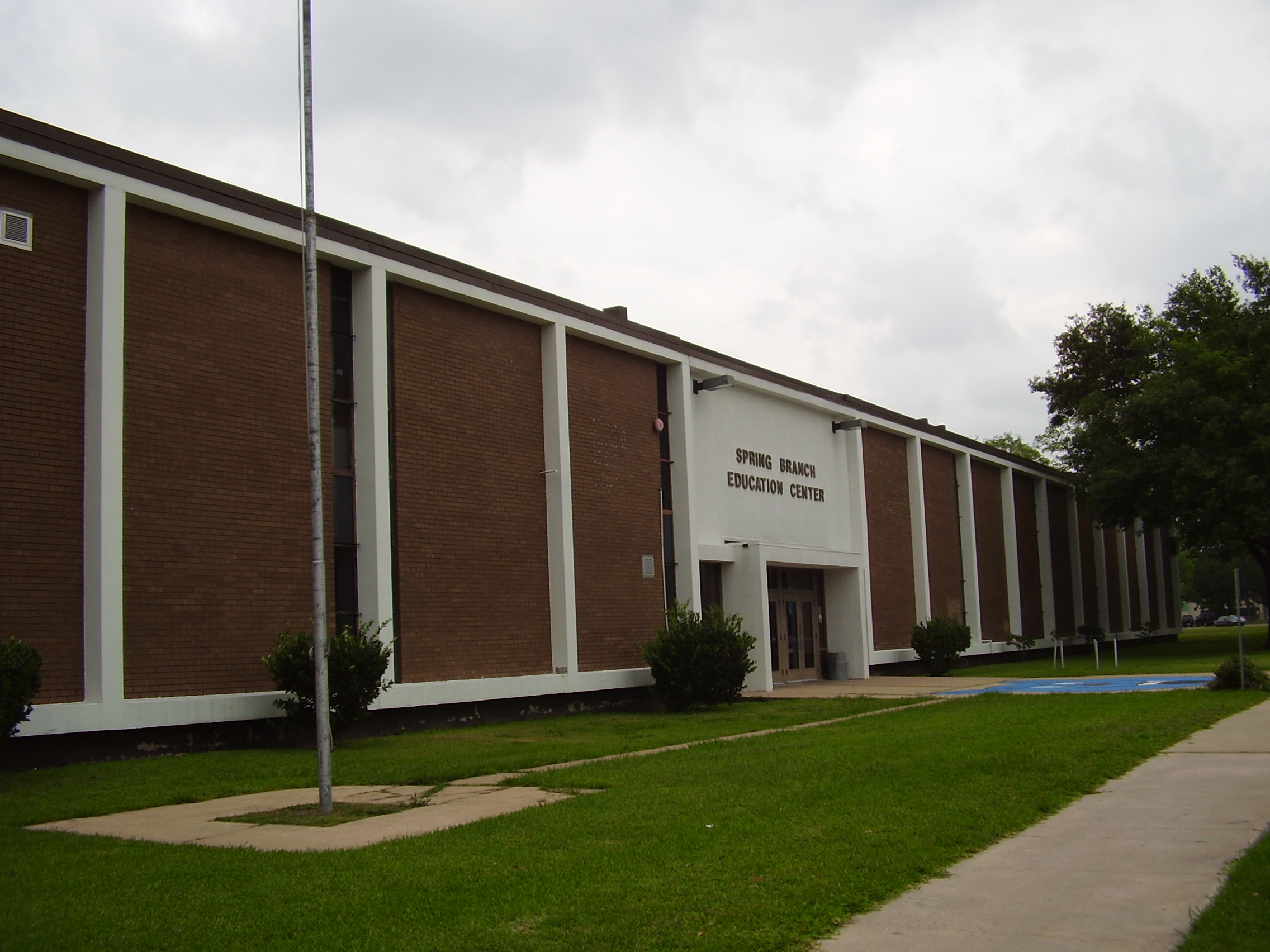
Spring Branch Education Center, home of the School of Choice

The Spring Branch School of Choice (SBSC) is an alternative school in the Spring Branch Independent School District in Spring Valley Village, Texas, United States. It serves grades 9–12.

SBSC was formerly known as Spring Branch High School (SBHS), which was the first high school in the district. The high school opened in 1948 with an initial enrollment of a few hundred students. By the late 1950s and early 1960s, the school's enrollment was exceeding its capacity and causing overcrowding. In response, the school district opened Memorial High School (MHS) in 1962 on the other side of Old Katy Road. Enrollment at SBHS however, continued to grow. Another high school, Spring Woods High School, opened in 1964. Northbrook High School opened in 1974 to ease additional overcrowding at Spring Branch and Spring Woods. By the mid-1980s, a decline in the school-age population across the district caused a decrease in enrollment at all high schools in the district. The district's board of trustees voted to close both SBHS and Westchester High School at the end of the 1984–85 school year. Most students who previously attended SBHS were rezoned to Northbrook and Spring Woods. Some SBHS students were rezoned to MHS. SBSOC was then opened in the former SBHS building as an alternative school for students not suited to the district's more traditional schools.

Many of the buildings that had made up SBHS were torn down in 2015 so that a new facility for the SBSC could be built in its place. A museum containing memorabilia from the former SBHS opened in October 2017 on the site of the old school's library.
