= Pam Lychner =

American real estate agent and crime victim advocate (1958–1996)

Personal details
- Born: Pamela Sue Rogers; November 9, 1958 Aurora, Illinois, U.S.
- Died: July 17, 1996 (aged 37) North Atlantic Ocean off the coast of East Moriches, New York, U.S.

Pamela Sue Rogers Lychner (November 9, 1958 – July 17, 1996) was an American real estate agent from Greater Houston who promoted the "Pam Lychner Sexual Offender Tracking and Identification Act of 1996" bill. She was killed in the explosion of TWA Flight 800.

== Life ==
Lychner, a former flight attendant for Trans World Airlines (TWA), bought a vacant house to sell in 1990. When she and her husband, Joe, visited it to meet who they believed was a prospective buyer, a workman from a cleaning company named William David Kelley appeared and told them that he forgot to clean under the sink. Later he tried to tear off her clothes; Joe held him as she called for help. Kelley, a convicted rapist and child molester, carried a knife and duct tape on his person and a blanket in his pickup truck. He plea bargained and received a sentence of 20 years for "aggravated kidnapping with intent to commit sex assault."

After the Texas Department of Criminal Justice (TDCJ) sent a letter to the Lychner residence, notifying the household that the state nominated Kelley as a candidate for early release, Lychner decided to become an advocate for victim's rights, founding the group "Justice For All." As its president, she lobbied for repealing mandatory release laws, and in favor of registration of sex offenders, as well as the construction of more prisons. Lisa Gray of the Houston Press said that Lychner would "get up at 4 a.m. to work on the Justice For All newsletter; at night, she'd fall asleep at the computer, and Joe would carry her to bed."

Lychner promoted and, according to U.S. Senators Phil Gramm and Joe Biden, crafted the language of a bill, later called the "Pam Lychner Sexual Offender Tracking and Identification Act of 1996," that established a federal database for United States sex offenders. In addition, the bill required sex offenders who move to new locations to contact authorities; if they fail to do so they face fines and prison sentences.

At the time of her death in 1996, Pam was married to Joe, and they had two daughters, 10-year-old Shannon and 8-year-old Katie. They lived in Spring Valley Village, Texas in Greater Houston.

== Death ==
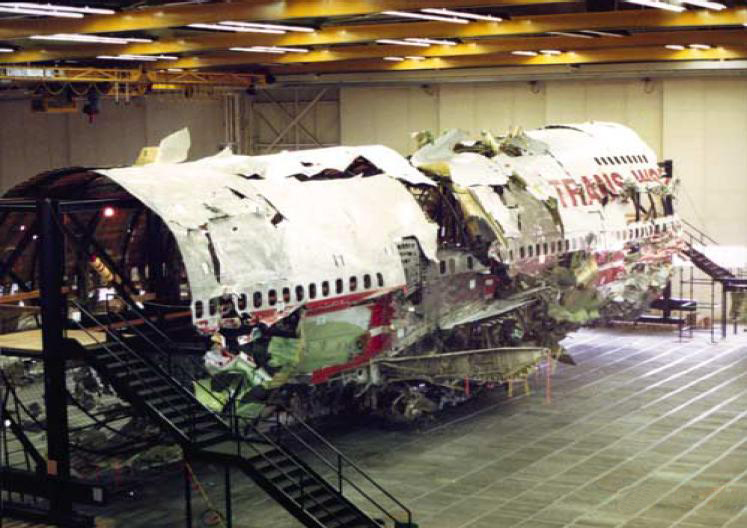
The reconstructed wreckage of TWA Flight 800, on which Pam and her daughters were killed, stored at the Calverton Executive Airpark

Shannon had copied Claude Monet's paintings, and Pam wanted her to see his former garden, Fondation Monet in Giverny, France. They had planned a three-day trip.

Pam, Shannon, and Katie flew from Houston to John F. Kennedy International Airport in New York City, and then connected to TWA Flight 800 bound for Charles de Gaulle International Airport near Paris, on July 17, 1996. N93119, the Boeing 747-100 used for Flight 800, exploded off the coast of Long Island, killing all 230 passengers and crew, including the three Lychners. Joe advocated for an investigation of Flight 800. According to him, Pam's and Katie's bodies were recovered during the first night of rescue efforts. On July 22, five days after the crash, the Suffolk County, New York coroners had identified Pam's body, and he was summoned to confirm the identification. Days later Katie's body was positively identified, and on July 28 Shannon's body was recovered. All three received burial in a family plot near Chicago, Illinois.

The National Transportation Safety Board (NTSB) concluded that a flammable mixture of air and aviation fuel vapors in the center wing fuel tank exploded, destroying the aircraft.

== Legacy ==
"Love's Embrace," a statue of Pam and her daughters in Spring Valley Village, Texas

After Pam, Shannon, and Katie died, the United States Congress passed the "Pam Lychner Sexual Offender Tracking and Identification Act of 1996."

On July 15, 1997, Spring Valley Village dedicated a bronze statue of her, Shannon, and Katie, called "Love's Embrace," at the city hall. After it was posted, visitors read the plaques, left roses, and touched the bronze. Joe often visited it. Lisa Gray of the Houston Press described it as "shamelessly emotional, a monument to a secular saint and her daughters."

Pam Lychner State Jail, a state jail for men operated by the Texas Department of Criminal Justice in Atascocita, unincorporated Harris County, east of Humble, was named after her. In July 1995, it had been opened as Atascocita State Jail. After Pam's death, the TDCJ board unanimously voted to rename it after her. A duplicate of the statue in Spring Valley Village exists near it.
