= Ty Allert =

American football player (born 1963)

No. 56, 58, 57, 51
- Position: Linebacker

Personal information
- Born: July 23, 1963 (age 63); Rosenberg, Texas, U.S.
- Listed height: 6 ft 2 in (1.88 m)
- Listed weight: 233 lb (106 kg)

Career information
- High school: Northbrook (Houston, Texas)
- College: Texas
- NFL draft: 1986: 4th round, 95th overall pick

Career history
- San Diego Chargers (1986–1987); Philadelphia Eagles (1987–1989); Denver Broncos (1990); Seattle Seahawks (1990)

Awards and highlights
- All-Southwest Conference (1985); Southwest Conference Champion (1983)

Career NFL statistics
- Fumble recoveries: 1
- Stats at Pro Football Reference

Ty Hunter Allert (born July 23, 1963) is an American former professional football player who was a linebacker in the National Football League (NFL) for five years with the San Diego Chargers, Philadelphia Eagles, Denver Broncos, and Seattle Seahawks. He played college football for the Texas Longhorns.

== Early life ==
He graduated from Northbrook High School in Houston, Texas in 1982.

== College career ==
Allert played college football at The University of Texas from 1982 to 1985 where he was a team captain, All-Southwest Conference and the team's MVP in 1985.

In 1982 he helped the team to the 1982 Sun Bowl and a #17/#18 ranking. In 1983 he helped the Longhorns win the Southwest Conference Championship and finish ranked #5, just barely missing the National Championship. In 1984, he surpassed the then team record of 106 tackles in a single season with 107 in the same year that Tony Degrate and Tony Edwards had 123 and 119 respectively and he played in the 1984 Freedom Bowl. In 1985 he led the team in sacks and tackles for loss as the team went to the 1985 Bluebonnet Bowl.

He graduated with 287 career tackles, then the 2nd most in school history behind only Doug Shankle; and among the 10 Longhorns with the most career sacks.

After the 1985 season, he played in the 1986 Senior Bowl.

== Pro career ==
Allert was selected by the Chargers in the fourth round of the 1986 NFL draft. The 6 ft 2 in (1.88 m), 233 pounds (106 kg) Allert is a former Texas Longhorns player (1982–85). He recorded 10½ quarterback sacks during the 1985 season.

== Later life ==
In 1991, Allert became a volunteer assistant for coach David McWilliams at Texas. Later he went into the operations management business in the Austin area.
