= Northbrook High School =

Northbrook Senior High School
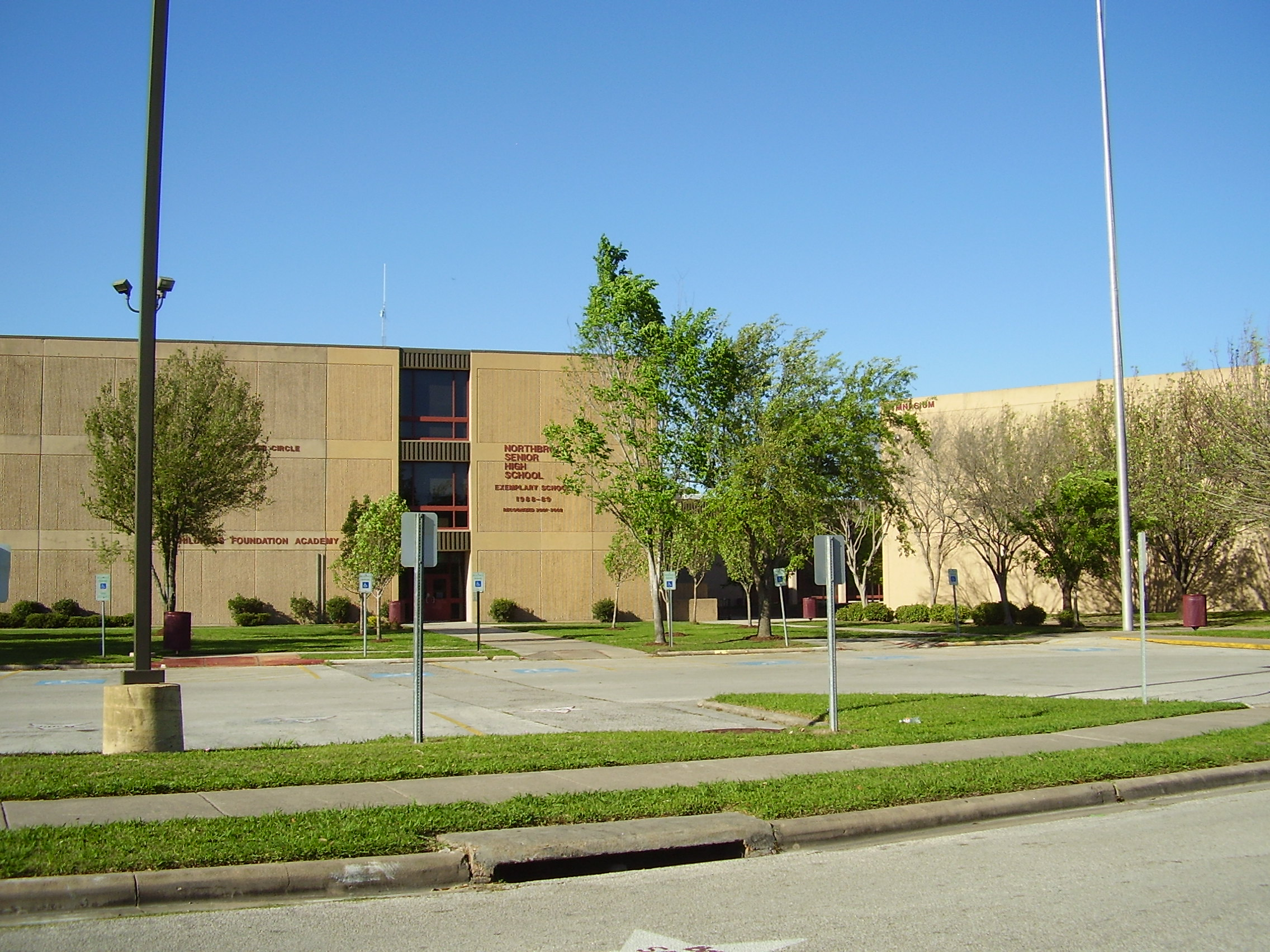

Location
- 1 Raider Circle, Houston, Texas 77080; United States; 29.8170°N 95.5318°W

Information
- Type: Public secondary
- Motto: "Defying The Odds"
- Established: 1974
- School district: Spring Branch ISD
- Principal: Dr. H. P. Hyder III
- Staff: 126.72 (FTE)
- Grades: 9 to 12
- Student to teacher ratio: 20.50
- Campus type: Suburban
- Colors: Maroon and silver
- Athletics: Baseball, Boys Basketball, Boys Soccer, Bandoleras (Dance and Drill), Cheerleading, Cross Country, Football, Girls Basketball, Girls Soccer, Navy Junior ROTC, Softball, Swimming, Tennis, Track, and Volleyball
- Mascot: The Ragin' Raider
- Rival: Spring Woods Senior High School
- Newspaper: The El Dorado
- Yearbook: The El Conquistador
- Website: nhs.springbranchisd.com

Northbrook High School (NHS) is a high school in Spring Branch, Houston, Texas. Northbrook is located inside Beltway 8 and outside the 610 Loop in western Houston. The school is one of four zoned high schools that are part of the Spring Branch Independent School District. Northbrook provides courses in the traditional academic subjects, as well as several foreign languages (such as Spanish and French), athletics, and fine arts. Several Advanced Placement (AP) courses are offered at Northbrook. Northbrook High's principal is Dr. H. P. Hyder III, the former principal of nearby Northbrook Middle School.

Northbrook's attendance area includes several neighborhoods throughout Spring Branch's Northern and Central districts such as Binglewood, Spring Oaks, Holley Terrace, and Langwood.

== History ==
Northbrook High School was established in 1973 at Spring Woods High School's Campus in the T-Shacks. Northbrook High School's Campus opened during the 1974–75 school year to ease overcrowding at Spring Branch High School and Spring Woods High School. Upon Northbrook’s establishment, it initially enrolled students from multiple grade levels. However, the first class to have completed all four years at the school, from freshman to senior year, graduated in 1979. In the 1980s, the Spring Branch Independent School District experienced a sharp decline in population due to job losses caused by the oil crisis affecting the Houston area. As many families moved away from the Spring Branch area, schools became underutilized. To address the decline in student enrollment, the district chose to close Spring Branch High School and Westchester High School during the 1985-86 school year. As a result, many former Spring Branch students were reassigned to Northbrook High School, leading to a significant increase in its student population.

Northbrook was named a 1988-89 National Blue Ribbon School.

In 2005, Northbrook received 'Academically Acceptable' as the Texas Education Agency Accountability Rating.

In 2020 Spring Branch Independent School District acquired 4.7 acres (1.9 ha) of formerly commercial land so it could build a detention pond to control flooding. On September 28, 2022, Spring Branch ISD cut a ribbon to mark a new set of classrooms at Northbrook High School. The new wing was funded by the district’s Bond Program of 2017, approved in November of that year by a vote of 80%. The work is one of a sequence of efforts to better buildings in the district that began with the Bond Program of 2007.

PBK Architects designed the additions and renovations to Northbrook High School in conjunction with the Project Advisory Committee, school staff, parents, and community members. The primary contractor for the construction work was Satterfield & Pontikes Construction.

Northbrook High School has been added to and renovated many times ever since its opening in 1974. The new wing brings 42,265 square feet to the school’s original size of 394,609 square feet, maintaining its distinctive architectural style. The work included new classrooms, interior and exterior improvements, sports area upgrades, and a new roof.

In the summer before the 2022–23 school year, Dr. H. P. Hyder became principal, replacing Dr. Antonio Avalos after only one year as principal. After the change in leadership, the school introduced new safety measures, including requiring students and staff to wear ID badges to enter the building. Beginning with the 2025–26 school year, the school also banned the use of cell phones and other personal communication devices during the school day to comply with Texas House Bill 1481.

== Athletics ==
Northbrook competes athletically with other schools in the sports of baseball, basketball, cross country, diving, football, golf, soccer, softball, swimming, tennis, track & field and volleyball. Northbrook has had a long-standing rivalry with fellow SBISD high school Spring Woods Senior High School ever since Northbrook's establishment in 1974 and every year since then, both schools have faced off at their annual homecoming football games.

Northbrook has never been to the playoffs in football in the school's history. The best football record was set during the 1981 season with a 7–3 record under then head coach Bob French, who was the offensive coordinator for the '78 Texas 4A State Champion Stratford Spartans.

The Northbrook Raider boys' soccer program has enjoyed some success in the last 14 seasons under Coach Justin Wheeler. Jonathan Claydon became the Raiders Soccer head coach in the 2023 season and led the Raiders to the District Championship and later on the state playoffs but would lose the first round against the Lamar Texans. The Raiders have earned playoff appearances in 1999, 2000, 2003, 2004, 2007, 2011, 2012, 2013, 2014, 2015, and 2023. They have made the state playoffs as representatives of class 4A, 5A and 6A. They were district champions in 2000, 2004, 2007, 2011, 2012, and 2023. They were a regional quarter-finalist in 2003 and a Regional Champion and 5A State Semi-Finalist in 2004. The Northbrook boys' soccer team competes in district 18AAAAAA along with Spring Woods, Stratford, Memorial, Klein, Klein Forest, Klein Collins and Klein Oak.

== Feeder patterns ==
The following elementary schools feed into Northbrook High School

- Buffalo Creek
- Cedar Brook
- Edgewood
- Hollibrook
- Ridgecrest
- Spring Shadows
- Housman (partial)
- Pine Shadows (partial)
- Terrace (partial)

The following middle schools feed into Northbrook High School:

- Northbrook Middle School
- Landrum Middle School (partial)
- Spring Woods Middle School (partial)

== Partnership ==
In 2015, YES Prep Northbrook opened inside the campus. It served a full 9–12 grade campus. It's part of the SKY Partnership in which the students came from YES Prep Northbrook Middle school and KIPP Courage College Prep @ Landrum Middle School. These students take regular classes at YES Prep, but they join regular Northbrook students in extra-curricular activities. In 2024, due to budget issues with SBISD, the district had to close down the SKY partnership.

== Notable alumni ==
- Ty Allert, former NFL linebacker for the Philadelphia Eagles
