= Spring Branch, Houston =

Neighborhood in Houston, Texas, US

Spring Branch East/West
- Houston, Texas, neighborhood
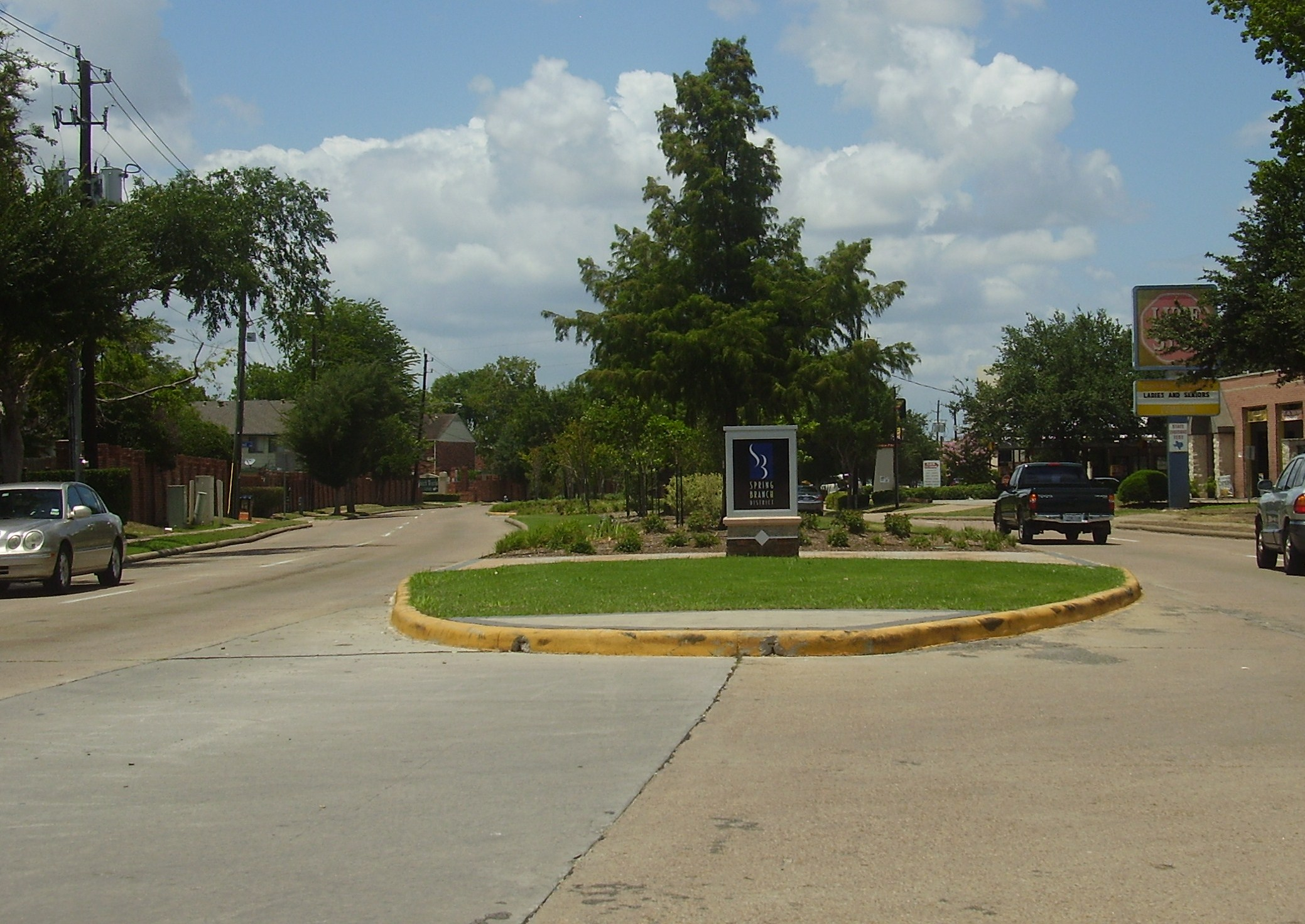
- Interactive map of Spring Branch East/West
- Coordinates: 29.81611°N 95.517719°W
- Elevation: 26 m (85 ft)

Population
  - Total: 134,225
- Time zone: UTC-6 (CST)
  - Summer (DST): UTC-5 (CDT)
- ZIP codes: 77080, 77041, 77043, 77055
- Website: sbmd.org

Spring Branch is a district in west-northwest Harris County, Texas, United States, roughly bordered by Tanner Road and Hempstead Road to the north, Beltway 8 to the west, Interstate 10 to the south, and the 610 Loop to the east; it is almost entirely within the city of Houston. Established by the Texas Legislature, the Spring Branch Management District exercises jurisdiction over the area.

Several minor bayous run through the community, including Brickhouse Gully, Spring Branch (the neighborhood namesake), and Briar Branch, which drain into Buffalo Bayou in central Houston. Spring Lake is a large pond near the center of the neighborhood.

Spring Branch includes significant immigrant Korean American and Hispanic American communities, and was established in the 1800s as a rural German American community. As of 2020, Spring Branch East/West population has grown by 7,298 residents and over 400 new construction homes built.

== History ==
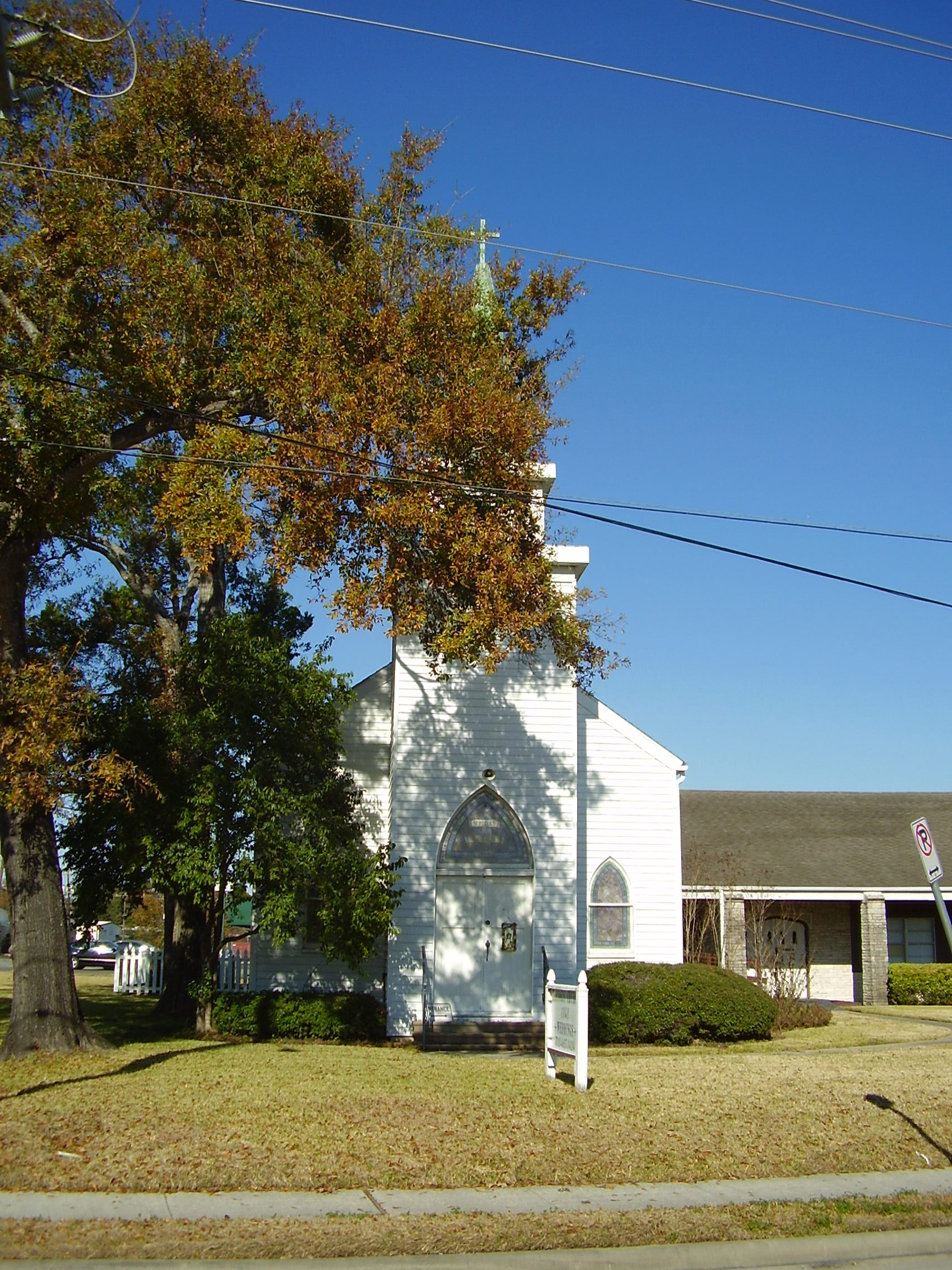
The historic St. Peter's United Church

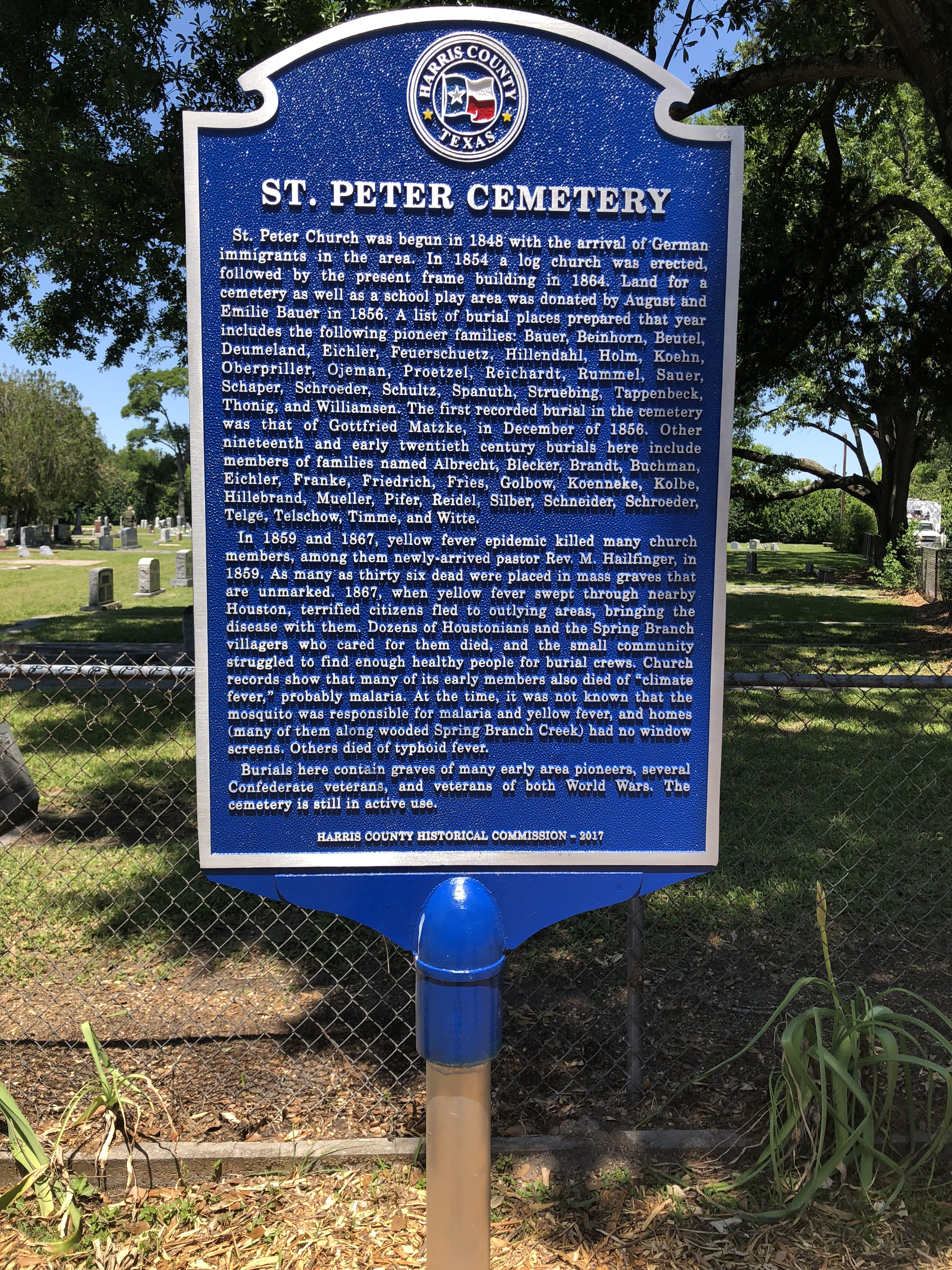
Historical marker at St. Peter's United Church including the names of the German families who both settled the area and are interred in the Church's cemetery.

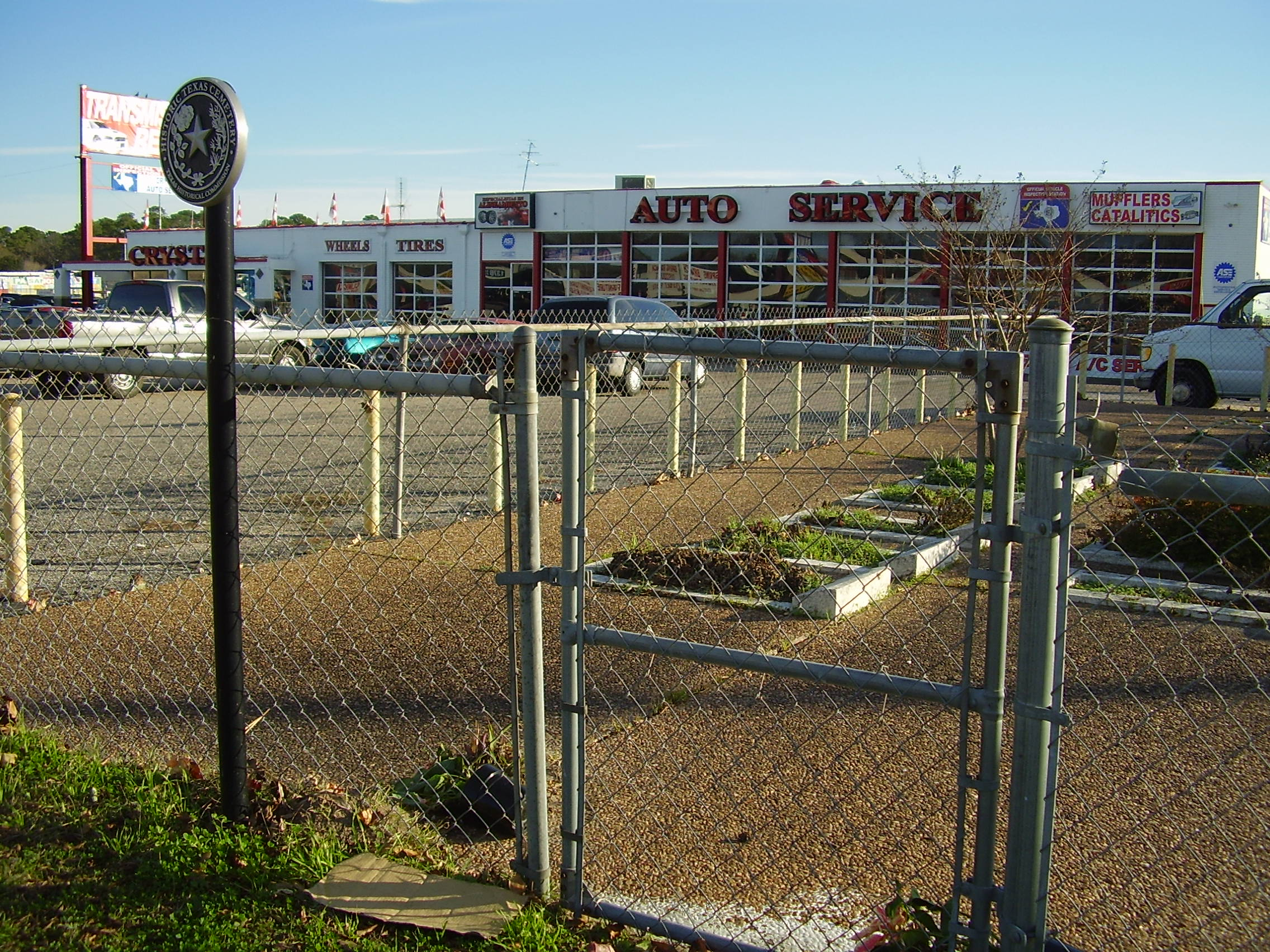
The 1,400 square feet (130 m^{2}) Hillendahl Cemetery, a designated Texas Historical Cemetery now within a shopping center parking lot, contains the graves of 19 members of the Hillendahl family, including one buried in 1854. The surrounding family land was sold off.

Spring Branch began as a religious German farmer settlement; many of the farmers owned dairies. Karl Kolbe, who arrived in Texas from Germany in 1830, was Spring Branch's earliest settler. The Germans opened sawmills to cut area timber. In 1848, St. Peter's United (Lutheran) Church opened on a site donated from the Bauer family; the lumber used in the construction originated from one of the local sawmills. The Spring Branch School Society, sponsored by the church in 1856, eventually became the Spring Branch Independent School District.

Yellow fever outbreaks in 1859 and 1867 killed many residents.

The early settlers all had roads named after their families – Gessner, Conrad Sauer, Witte, Wirt, Blalock, Campbell, Hillendahl, Bauer, Fries, and Neuens.

After World War II James E. Lyon served as a developer in Spring Branch.

The eastern part of Spring Branch was annexed by the City of Houston in the 1940s while the western part was annexed in the 1950s. In the mid-1950s, efforts to create a Spring Branch municipality failed. Following this, the Memorial villages, a group of six independent municipalities, formed. Houston annexed the rest of the Spring Branch area. In the mid-to-late 20th century, Spring Branch had a rural suburban character with dirt roads and horses in the area. Spring Branch Elementary School, one of several area elementary schools, was an all-White elementary school.

Apartment complexes opened in the Spring Branch area around the 1970s. In 1982, the City of Houston Housing Authority proposed a $3.8 million U.S. dollar public housing unit at Emnora Lane. The city encountered strong opposition from civic clubs, city council members, and state representatives, so the city housing officials canceled the project. The sign used by the city to indicate the proposed site repeatedly received spray paint graffiti stating "no niggers."

By the 1980s, Houston's economy had collapsed and occupancy rates declined. Many apartment complexes faced foreclosure, bankruptcy, and changes in ownership. Bill Zermeno, a city electrical inspector, said in a 1988 Houston Chronicle article that many of the apartments with some of the strongest violations against maintenance-related city laws were in Spring Branch. Kim Cobb, the author of the 1988 Houston Chronicle article, said that many of the poorly maintained complexes were located next to well-maintained single family subdivisions.

From the 1980 U.S. Census to the 1990 Census, many Hispanics settled in parts of Spring Branch; in pockets of Spring Branch almost all of the immigration was from Central American countries. The Hispanic population increased by an amount between 1,000 and 3,500 per square mile. In 1997, S.D. Kim, the Houston bureau chief of The Korea Times, said that Koreatown, the Korean community in Spring Branch, grew because of inexpensive housing and the zoning to the Spring Branch Independent School District. In 1998 and again in 2001, a proposal to place Korean language street signs in Koreatown led to political controversy; the reaction against the proposal led to the withdrawal of the proposal. By 2006, Spring Branch Elementary School was mostly Hispanic, reflecting demographic changes in the Spring Branch area. By 2007 several older houses were torn down and replaced with newer houses; new homeowners came to Spring Branch to buy larger lots, to buy in an area cheaper than neighborhoods bordering Downtown Houston. New residents came due to the proximity to Downtown, Uptown, and the Energy Corridor.

In May 2011, the Spring Branch Central Super Neighborhood campaigned against having federal funds used to improve older apartment complexes in the area.

In 2013, Houstonia magazine stated that Spring Branch, including the adjacent cities of Hillshire Village and Spring Valley Village, was one of the "25 Hottest Neighborhoods" of Houston.

On May 5, 2016, a four alarm fire occurred in Houston's Spring Branch area, not to be confused with the municipality of Spring Branch, TX, north of San Antonio Texas

On November 24, 2022, a gunman opened fire and shot four people, two fatally during Thanksgiving in the Spring Branch neighborhood.

== Cityscape ==
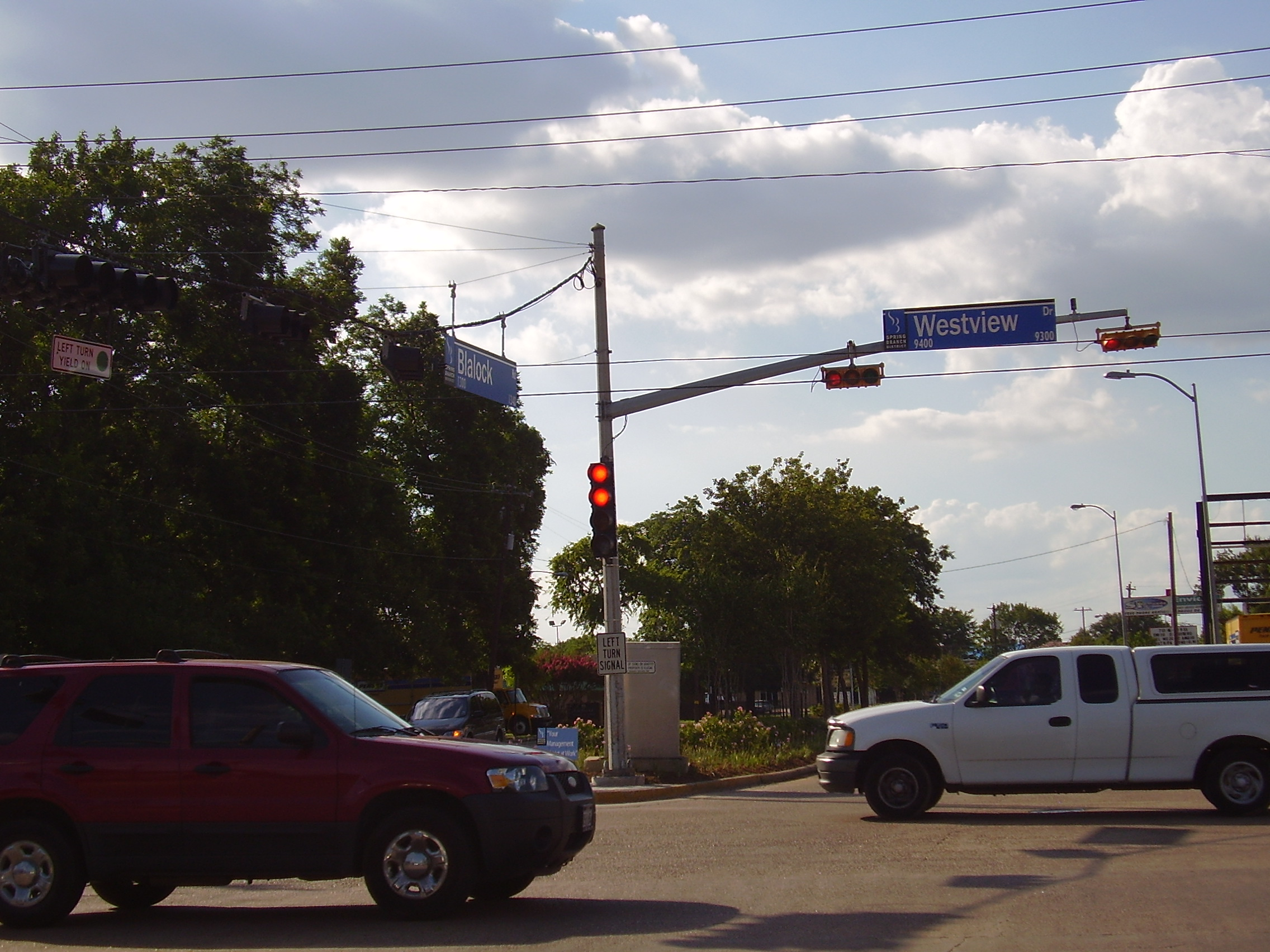
The intersection of Blalock and Westview, with Spring Branch street signs

Spring Branch is generally bounded by Beltway 8 on the western end, the 610 Loop on the eastern end, Interstate 10 on the southern end, and U.S. Highway 290 and Tanner Road to the north.

The district has access to Interstate 10, the 610 Loop, Beltway 8, and the Hempstead Highway. The district is in proximity to Downtown Houston, the Energy Corridor, the Memorial City District (including Memorial City Mall and the Memorial Hermann Hospital Memorial City), the Texas Medical Center, Uptown Houston (including The Galleria), and Westchase.

Terrence McCoy of the Houston Press said in 2012 that in Spring Branch "[a]venues lined with orderly yards and American flags buttress shopping centers where Spanish dominates."

As of 2012 there are different varieties of housing in Spring Branch. Spring Branch West includes many 1960s ranch-style houses. The central portion of Spring Branch has houses which are worth about $500,000 as of 2012. The eastern portion of Spring Branch, which is blue collar, has many bungalow houses with wood siding. Houstonia wrote that "Up until [the 2000s] or so, much of Spring Branch had a rural feel. It wasn’t uncommon to see pastures full of horses, relics of its past life as farmland tilled by generations of German immigrants".

In 1983 there were a travel agent, an optical shop, multiple restaurants, a newsstand, a bookstore, a pharmacy, and a furniture store in Spring Branch catering to Koreans.

== Economy ==
John Nova Lomax of the Houston Press said that Spring Branch has many "old-school ethnic eateries" and described Long Point Road, Spring Branch's main road, as "thrift store nirvana". The journalist added that Long Point has few chain businesses and stores. The Koreatown portion has various Korean restaurants.

La Michoacana Meat Market has its headquarters in Spring Branch and in Houston. BJ Services Company has its headquarters in the Spring Branch district and in unincorporated Harris County. Tesco Corporation has its headquarters in the Spring Branch district and in Houston. Cameron International Corporation's Drilling and Production Systems center is in the Westway Business Park in Spring Branch and in an unincorporated area.

Previously, Igloo Corporation had a manufacturing facility in Spring Branch. The Spring Branch location also housed the company headquarters. In 2004, Igloo announced that it was consolidating to a location in unincorporated Waller County, Texas, near Katy.

Before its dissolution, Weiner's had its headquarters in Spring Branch and in Houston. At one time, AppleTree Markets had its headquarters in Spring Branch and in Houston.

By 2008 a Super H Mart supermarket, a part of a Korean American chain, opened. Purva Patel of the Houston Chronicle wrote that this supermarket attracted development to the area.

== Diplomatic missions ==
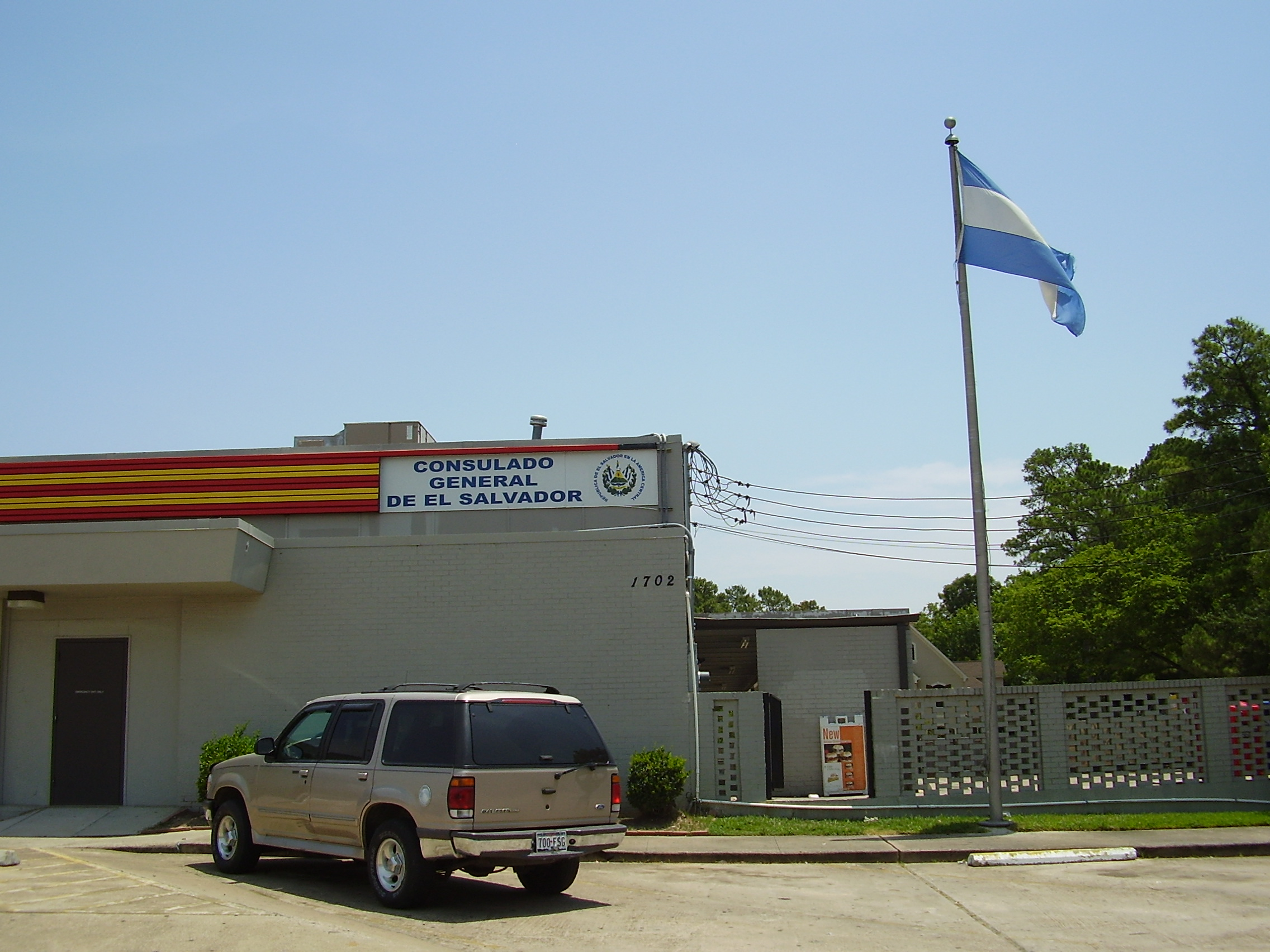
Consulate-General of El Salvador in Houston

The Consulate-General of El Salvador in Houston resides at 1720 Hillendahl Boulevard in Spring Branch.

== Government and infrastructure ==
=== Local government ===
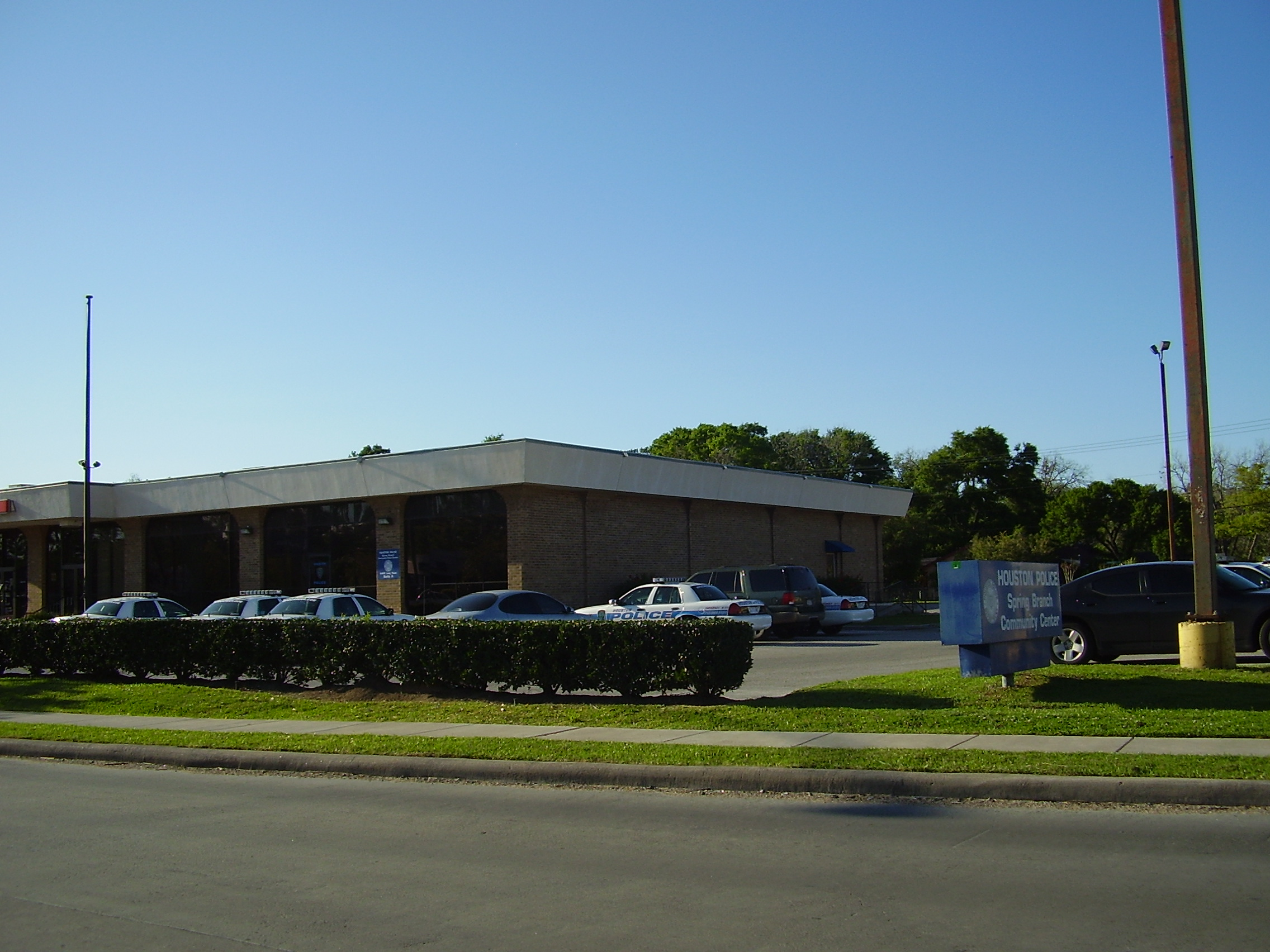
Houston Police Department Spring Branch Storefront at 8400 Long Point Road #A

The Spring Branch District within Houston is served by the Houston Police Department Northwest Patrol Division, headquartered at 6000 Teague Road. The Spring Branch Storefront Station is located at Suite A at 8400 Long Point Road.

The Houston Fire Department serves areas within Houston and operates Fire Station #5 Old Spring Branch at 2020 Hollister Road, Fire Station #38 West Side at 1120 Silber Road, Fire Station #49 at 1212 Gessner Drive, and Fire Station #77 Spring Shadows at 10155 Kempwood Drive; the stations are in Fire District 5. Some unincorporated areas in Spring Branch are served by the Houston Fire Department, while others are served by the Cy-Fair Volunteer Fire Department. Station 38 was built in 1955. Station 49 opened in a former Spring Branch Volunteer Fire Department facility at Campbell at Long Point in 1956. Station 49 moved to Gessner at Westview in 1961. Station 5 moved from what is now Downtown Houston to Spring Branch in 1977. Station 77 opened in 1990. Station 38 was last renovated during the financial year of 1995. Station 49 closed in April 2008 before undergoing a $753,821.40 renovation. The station reopened on February 9, 2009, and the re-opening ceremony occurred on March 16, 2009. A renovation of Station 5 is scheduled for 2011.

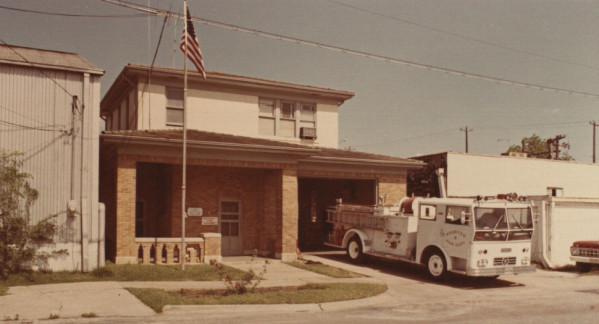
Fire Station 5, 1976

Houston City Council District A covers areas of Spring Branch in Houston. As of 2014 Brenda Stardig represents the district. In the 1990s a small portion of Spring Branch was in City Council District G.

The city of Houston organized the areas in Spring Branch within Houston into the #8 Westbranch, #10 Spring Branch West, #84 Spring Shadows, #85 Spring Branch Central, and #86 Spring Branch East super neighborhoods.

The council for #10 Super Neighborhood opened on May 11, 2000. The council for the #85 Super Neighborhood, which includes the Binglewood, Binglewood 5, Campbell Woods, Hollister Place, Holley Terrace, Kempwood North, Langwood II, Outpost Estates, Spring Branch Estates II, Spring Branch Oaks, Springwood/Timbercreek, and Western Oaks subdivisions, many of which still have deed restrictions, opened on August 24, 2000. The council for the #84 Super Neighborhood, which mostly consists of deed-restricted, single family subdivisions such as Spring Shadows and also includes nine apartment complexes and one mobile home area, opened on March 14, 2005. Subdivisions within Super Neighborhood #86 include Afton Village, Brykerwoods, Monarch Oaks, Ridgecrest, Hillendahl Acres, Long Point Oaks, Pine Terrace, and Westview Terrace.

In 2011 the City of Houston opened a permanent electronics recycling center in Spring Branch.

The Spring Branch Management District is headquartered at 9610 Long Point Drive. The Spring Branch Management District's mission is to positively impact public safety, business development, environmental and urban design, and mobility and transportation to help create an environment attractive to business, to facilitate profitability, and to promote the redevelopment and growth of the area. Ongoing programs spearheaded by the Spring Branch Management District include working with the Houston Police Department to promote its Blue Star Program to bring apartment complexes and multifamily residential units into compliance with current city codes, providing constable patrols to enhance security, removing graffiti on public and private property, maintaining various landscapes throughout the district, removing bandit signs, enforcing news rack ordinance, and pursuing health code violations. The management district's boundaries are almost entirely within the City of Houston; a portion in the north is in an unincorporated area in Harris County.

==== Local politics ====
As of 2012, according to Bob Stein, a Rice University political scientist, voters in Houston City Council District A tend to be older people, conservative, and White American, and many follow the Tea Party movement. The voting base is such despite the presence of large Hispanic neighborhoods within District A. In the 2011 election voters in Spring Branch, for City Council District A, favored Tea Party candidate Helena Brown over the incumbent, Brenda Stardig, because Stardig supported a "rain tax," passed in 2010, that lead to taxation of churches. However, Stardig later voted to exempt church- and non-profit-property-owners from the "rain tax". The taxation of churches had a negative reception with political conservatives in Spring Branch. In the 1990s a small portion of Spring Branch was in City Council District G. In 1989, during a city council race, many in Spring Branch voted for Jim Westmoreland for an at-large position. Westmoreland drew controversy after reports of a joke that was characterized as "racist" spread. Beverley Clark, the opponent and a Black teacher, defeated Westmoreland in that race.

=== County representation ===
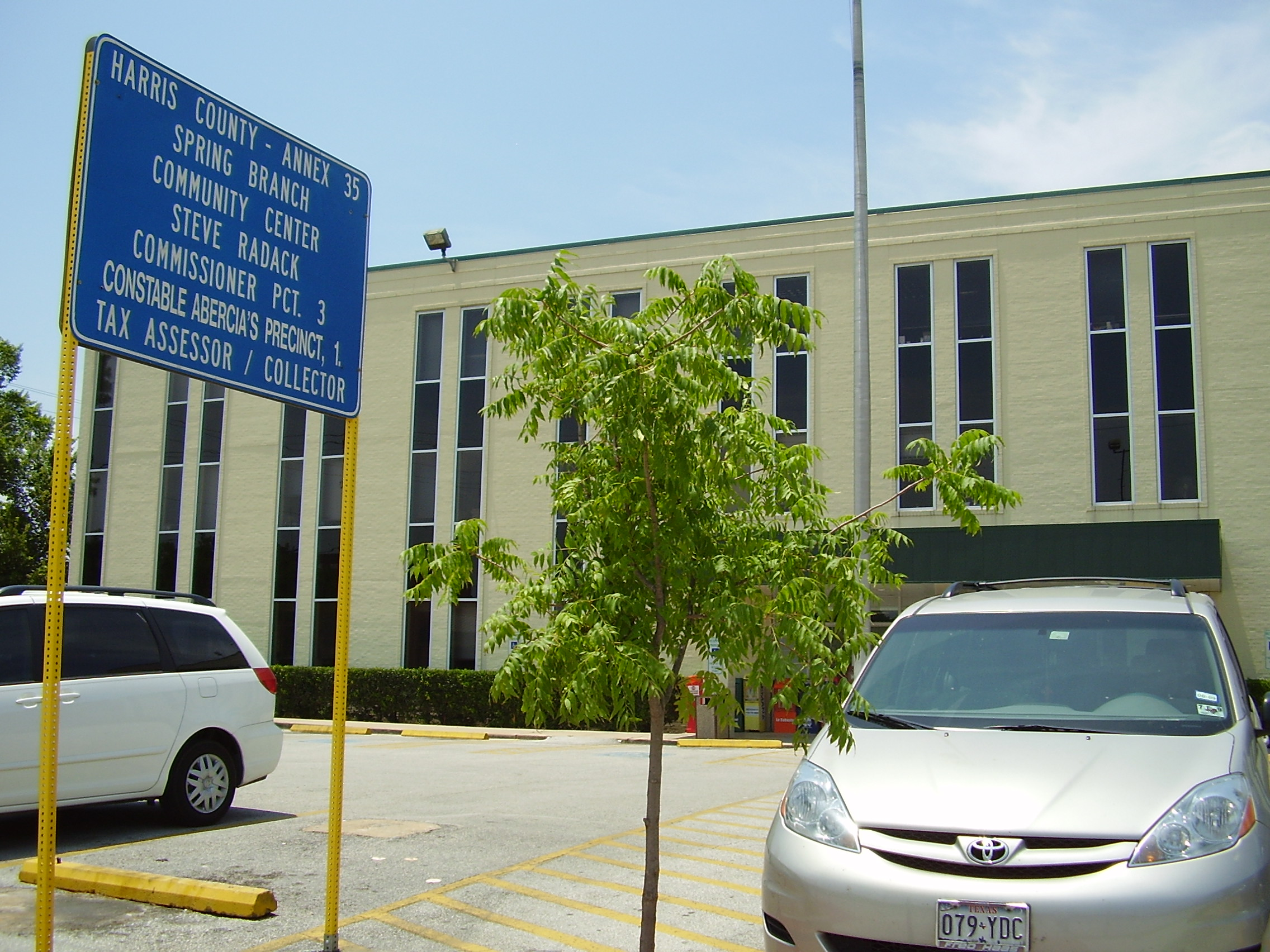
Spring Branch Community Center

Harris County Precinct Three, headed by Steve Radack as of 2008, serves portions of Spring Branch. Harris County Precinct Four, headed by Jerry Eversole as of 2008, serves other portions of Spring Branch. Harris County Constable Precinct 5 patrols much of Spring Branch. The unincorporated area within the Spring Branch Management District is assigned to the Harris County Sheriff's Office District IV Patrol, headquartered at the Clay Road Substation at 16715 Clay Road. The Harris County Department of Education maintains an office in the North Post Oak Building in Spring Branch. The Harris County Toll Road Authority operates its West Area EZ Tag Store in Spring Branch.

Harris County Precinct 3 operates the Spring Branch Community Center and Courthouse Annex and a tax office at 1721 Pech Road in Spring Branch. Alma Corporation built the building now housing the Spring Branch Community Center in the late 1960s. In 1971 Alma sold the building to Sam Houston Memorial Hospital; in 1976 the hospital sold the building to Houghton and Neville West. Harris County bought the building in 1986, causing it to become a courthouse. Bob Eckels, then the Precinct 3 commissioner, established a community center in the ground floor's north half. Steve Radack became the commissioner of Precinct 3 and began renovating the building. After the census of 1990 the county rezoned the community center and the surrounding neighborhood into Precinct 4. During the 1990s changes to the center occurred. The county moved the center back into Precinct 3 after the 2000 Census. In 2011 the Trini Mendenhall Sosa Community opened, taking in the previous community center.

=== State and federal representation ===
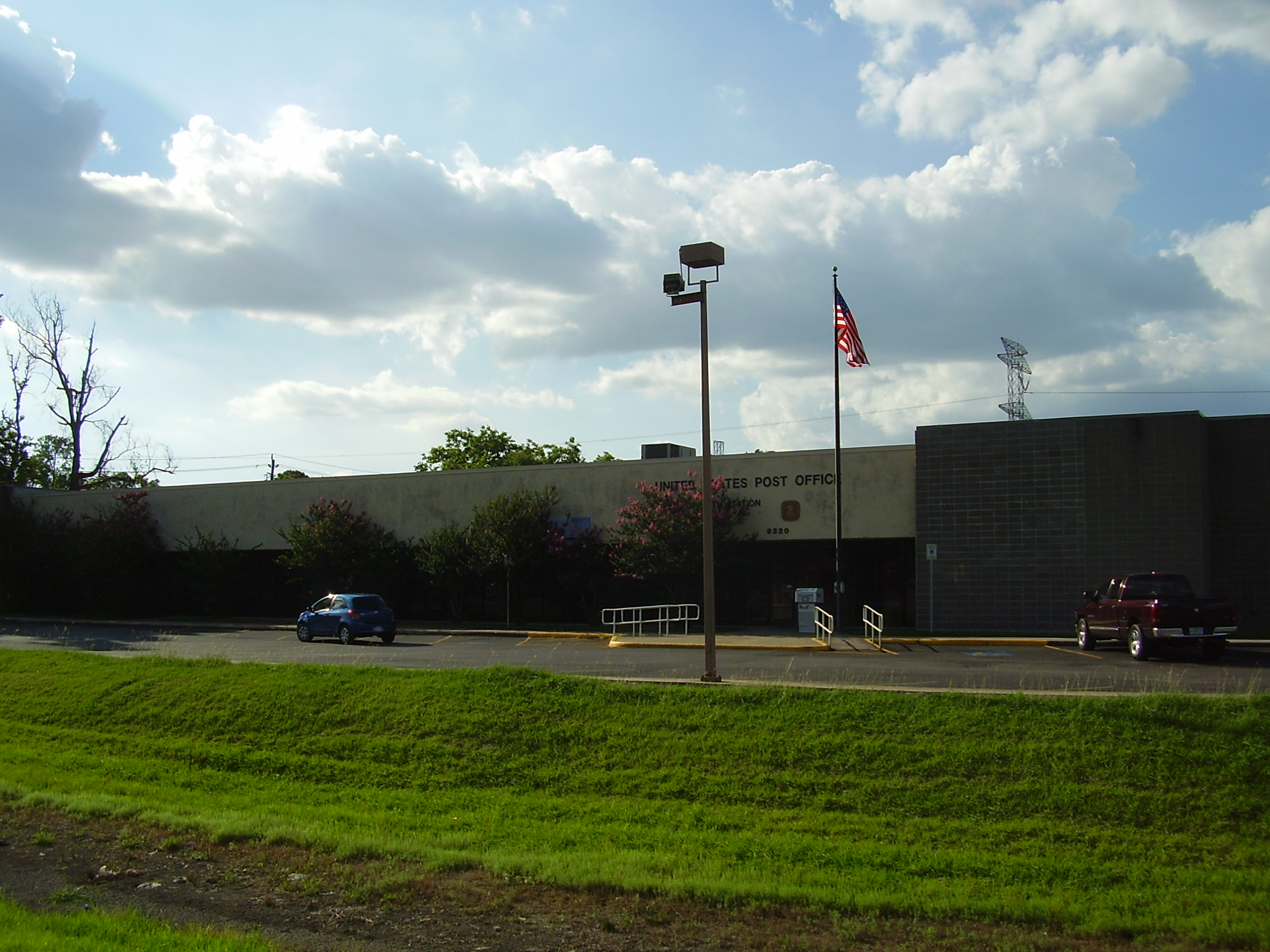
James Griffith Station of the United States Postal Service

Parts of Spring Branch located in District 136 of the Texas House of Representatives which has been represented by Republican Tony Dale since 2012. Parts of Spring Branch located in District 138 of the Texas House of Representatives, which has been represented by Republican Dwayne Bohac since 2002. A portion of Spring Branch is within District 7 of the Texas Senate; as of 2008 Dan Patrick represents the district. Parts of Spring Branch are within District 15 of the Texas Senate; as of 2008 John Whitmire represents the district.

Spring Branch is primarily in Texas's 2nd congressional district, which has been represented by Republican Dan Crenshaw since 2019. Spring Branch is partially in Texas's 18th congressional district, which has been represented by Democrat Sheila Jackson Lee since 1995. A portion of Spring Branch is also in Texas's 7th congressional district, which has been represented by Democrat Lizzie Fletcher since 2019.

The United States Postal Service operates post offices in Spring Branch. The James Griffith Station and the Long Point Station are in the community.

== Demographics ==
Between the 1990 U.S. census and the 2000 U.S. census, as Spring Branch gained many Hispanic and Korean residents, many white residents left. Nestor Rodriguez, an immigration expert from the University of Houston, said that the white population of Spring Branch implied that many were leaving not because of racial differences but because the new residents were not middle class. Rodriguez said, "They don't say they're not middle-class, but they say, well, look at them, they're out on the street corners looking for work; we're not used to that. But those are characteristics of working-class or lower working-class people."

In 2000, the City of Houston's Super Neighborhoods located all or in part within Spring Branch reported the following population statistics:

Super Neighborhood	SN #	Population	Hispanic	%	White	%	Black	%	Asian	%	Native American	%	Native Hawaiian	%	other non-Hispanic	%	2 or more races	%
Westbranch	8	4,321	1,532	35.45%	1,289	29.83%	235	5.44%	1,224	28.33%	0	0.00%	2	0.05%	0	0.00%	39	0.90%
Spring Branch West	10	32,423	17,059	52.61%	11,353	35.02%	1,878	5.80%	1,627	5.02%	59	0.18%	11	0.03%	44	0.14%	392	1.21%
Spring Branch North	84	18,402	6,403	34.80%	8,976	48.78%	1,151	6.25%	1,560	8.48%	27	0.15%	8	0.04%	42	0.23%	235	1.28%
Spring Branch Central	85	29,074	18,844	64.81%	7,678	26.41%	1,190	4.09%	1,103	3.79%	44	0.15%	6	0.02%	23	0.08%	186	0.64%
Spring Branch East	86	26,491	16,275	61.44%	7,872	29.72%	1,075	4.06%	945	3.57%	51	0.19%	5	0.02%	27	0.10%	240	0.91%

== Health care ==
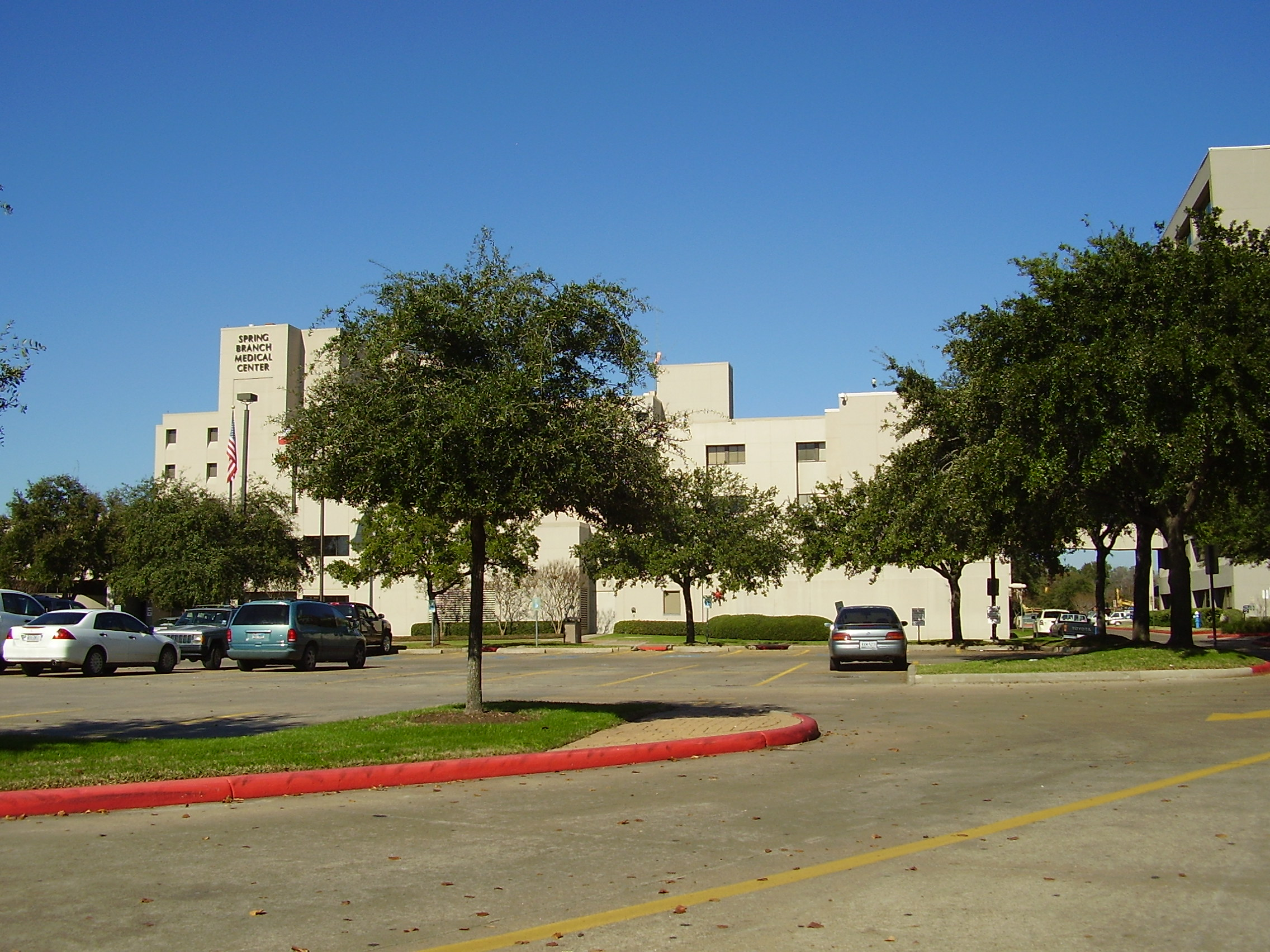
Spring Branch Medical Center

The Spring Branch Medical Center, located in Spring Branch, was the first hospital outside of the Texas Medical Center to perform open heart surgery. As the owners of the Spring Branch Medical Center attempted to sell the facility to the Harris County Hospital District (now Harris Health System), the owners announced that the hospital would close by May 1, 2010. Because the hospital was ending inpatient services, it announced that it was laying off 720 employees. As of March 2010 it employed 509 full-time employees and 211 part-time employees. The hospital plans to continue offering outpatient programs such as emergency care services, imaging services, and radiation oncology.

Houston-based McVey & Co. Investments LLC purchased Spring Branch Medical Center, at 8850 Long Point Road, early 2011. Marty McVey, chairman of the hospital, attempted to reopen the historic community hospital. However, the hospital fell into foreclosure in 2013 and was demolished in early 2015 to make way for a new residential/retail project.

Texas Children's Pediatric Associates Spring Branch, a child health care center affiliated with Texas Children's Hospital, is located in Spring Branch.

Harris Health System designated Northwest Health Center for ZIP codes 77055 and 77080. The nearest public hospital is Ben Taub General Hospital in the Texas Medical Center.

== Education ==
=== Primary and secondary schools ===
==== Public schools ====
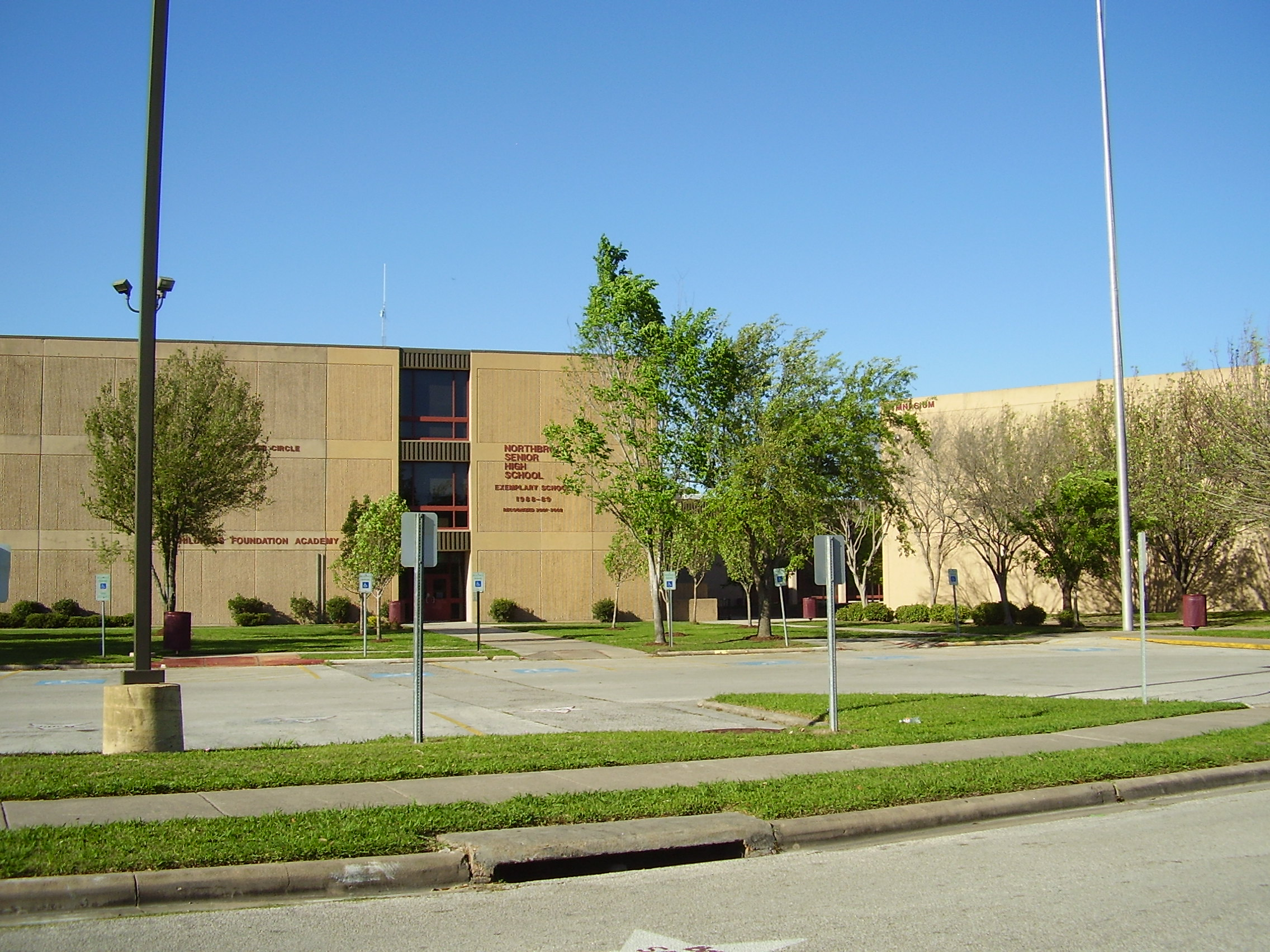
Northbrook High School

Spring Branch Independent School District serves most of the areas within the Spring Branch Management District, all of the Memorial area in Houston, and several small cities.

Middle schools in Spring Branch ISD serving the Spring Branch area include Landrum Middle School, Northbrook Middle School, Spring Oaks Middle School, and Spring Woods Middle School. In addition Spring Forest Middle School in the Memorial community of Houston and Spring Branch Middle School in the City of Hedwig Village serve sections of Spring Branch.

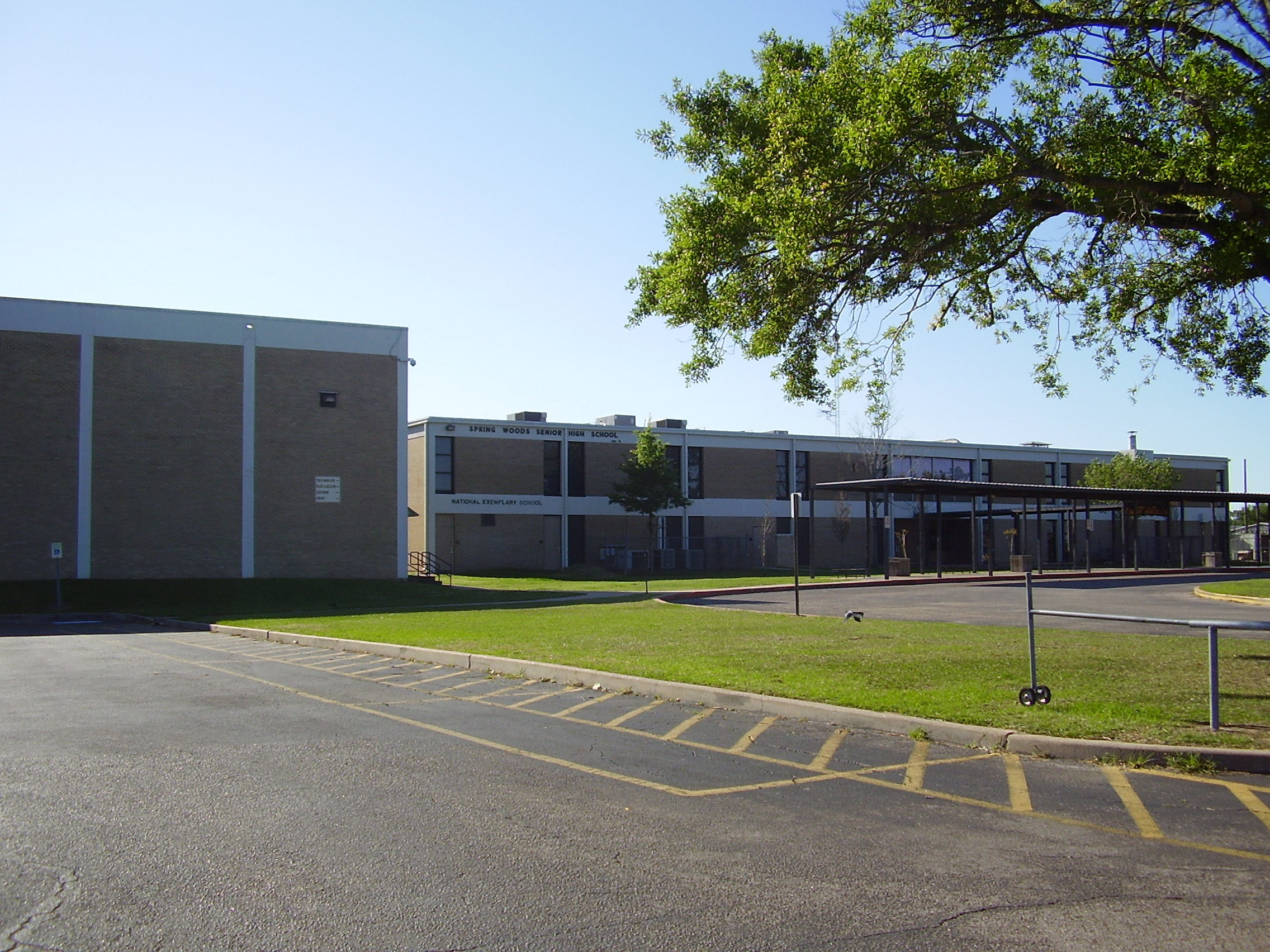
Spring Woods High School

Most SBISD areas in the Spring Branch District are within the separate attendance boundaries of Spring Woods High School and Northbrook High School in Spring Branch. The southern portions of west Spring Branch have students zoned to Stratford High School in the Memorial area of Houston. Some areas of Spring Branch along Westview and Interstate 10 have students zoned to Memorial High School in the City of Hedwig Village.

Some areas within the district are within the Cypress-Fairbanks Independent School District. The area is divided between the attendance zones of Bane Elementary School in Houston, Kirk Elementary School in unincorporated Harris County, and Lee Elementary School in unincorporated Harris County. The area is divided between the attendance zones of Dean Middle School in Houston and Truitt Middle School in unincorporated Harris County. All residents of that area are zoned to Cypress Ridge High School in unincorporated Harris County.

There is a small segment of land in the Spring Branch district that is within the Houston Independent School District. The land in this segment is used for industrial, commercial, and transportation/utility reasons.

==== Private schools ====
The Roman Catholic Archdiocese of Galveston-Houston operates The Regis School of the Sacred Heart, a K-8 school for boys, and St. Jerome School, a coeducational K-8 school, in Spring Branch. For the high school levels, Saint John XXIII High School (formerly Pope John XXIII High School) in western Harris County, within Greater Katy, is in proximity to Spring Branch.

Other private schools located in Spring Branch include The Awty International School, Houston Christian High School, Fair Haven Day Methodist School, Houston Sudbury School, ILM Academy (Islamic Education Institute of Texas a.k.a. Darul Arqam) at Spring Branch Islamic Center, St. Mark Lutheran School, and The Monarch School. Originally the Monarch School had a campus in Spring Branch and a campus in Hilshire Village. In Spring 2009 all programs of The Monarch School moved to a new campus on Kempwood Drive in Spring Branch. The Parish School is located in a plot of land bordering the Spring Branch District. The Parish School moved from its former campus, now the site of The Rainard School, to the new campus in 2005. Western Academy, a 3-8 boys private school, is in Spring Branch.

School of the Woods is a college prep Montessori School for early childhood through grade 12 in nearby Hilshire Village; some of the school property is in Houston.

=== Community colleges ===
Houston Community College System (HCC) serves Spring Branch ISD. Lone Star College serves Cy-Fair ISD.

HCC operates the Spring Branch Center, a part of the Northwest College, in Memorial City. The facility was known as the Town and Country Campus until 2009. The college is inside the former Town and Country Mall. In 1999 a former 112,000-square-foot (10,400 m^{2}) AMC Theatres and KMart building in Town and Country was re-tenanted to HCC. HCC signed its lease to occupy portions of the Town & Country Square Shopping Center in 1999. During that year the owners of the Town & Country Square Shopping Center filed a lawsuit against HCC for trying to stop a Barnes & Noble from opening in the shopping center premises.

=== Public libraries ===
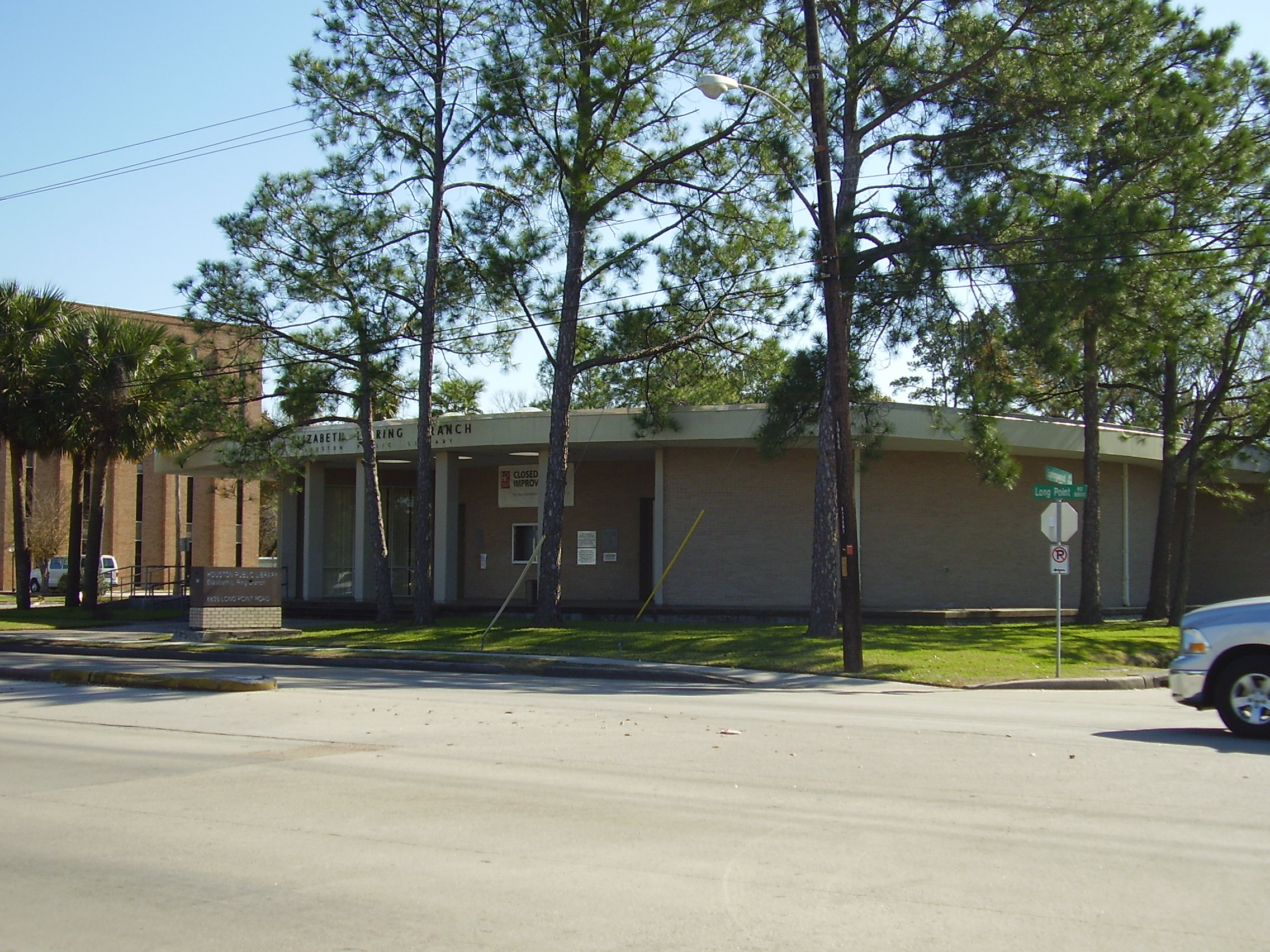
Elizabeth L. Ring Neighborhood Library

The Houston Public Library operates the Arnold L. Hillendahl Neighborhood Library at 2436 Gessner Road and the Elizabeth L. Ring Neighborhood Library at 8835 Long Point Road. The Harris County Public Library (HCPL) system operates the Spring Branch Memorial Branch at 930 Corbindale Road in the City of Hedwig Village. The 10,500-square-foot (980 m^{2}) branch opened in 1975.

== Parks and recreation ==
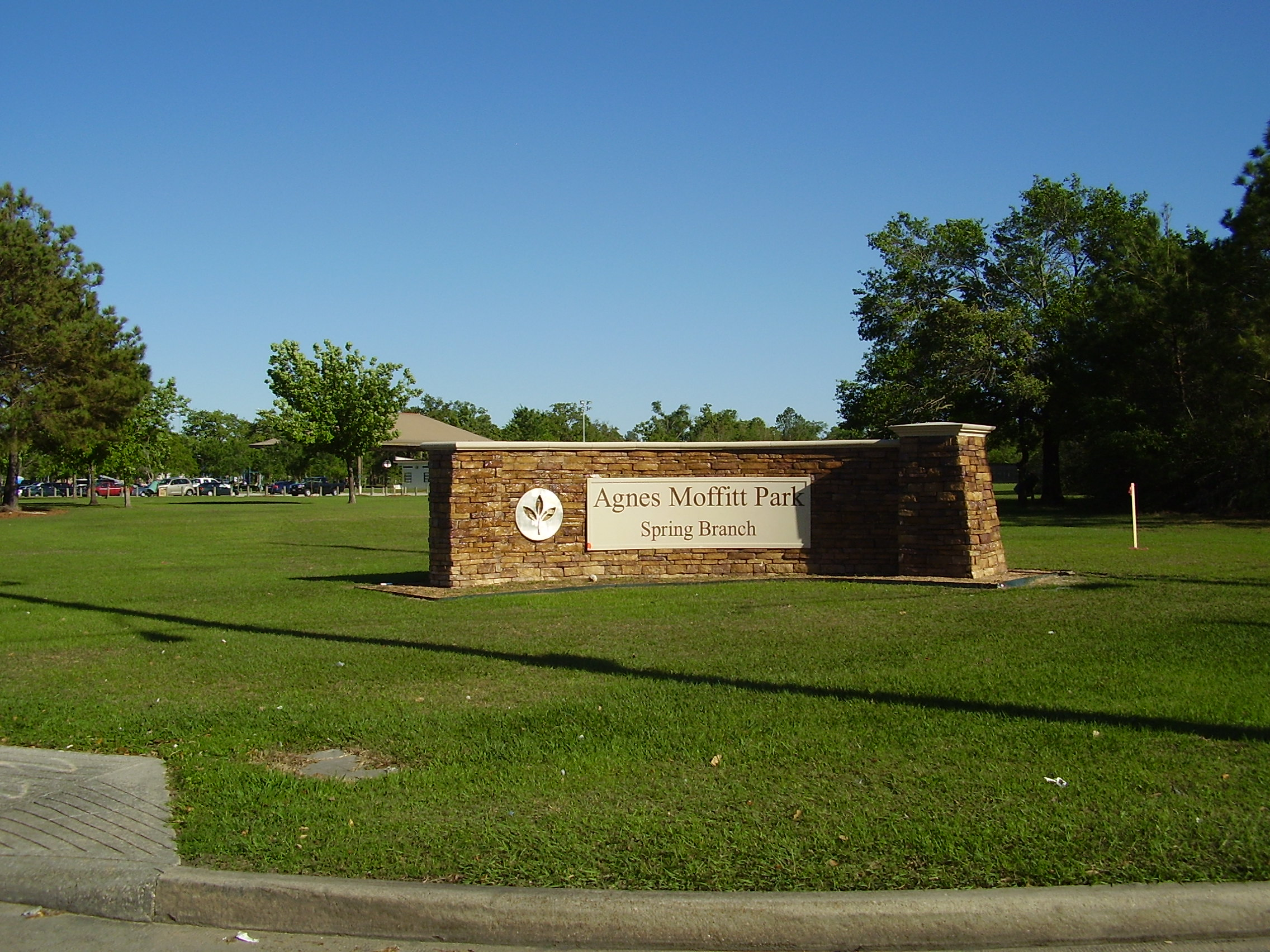
Agnes Moffit Park

The district includes parks operated by the city government and the county government.

The Houston Parks and Recreation Department operates municipal parks within the Spring Branch Management District. Agnes Moffit Park, located at 10645 Hammerly Boulevard, has a swimming pool and a golf course. The R.L. and Cora Johnson Park is located at 9791 Tanner Road. The adjacent R. L. and Cora Johnson Community Center, located at 9801 Tanner Road, has a 0.25 mile hike and bicycle trail, a playground, an outdoor basketball pavilion, and lighted tennis courts. The park was originally known as the Carverdale Park; it was renamed in January 2009 after some civic leaders. Freed Park and Community Center is located at 7020 Shadyvilla Lane. The park has an indoor gymnasium, a .35 mile hike and bicycle trail, a playground, a lighted sports field. Schwartz Park is located at 8203 Vogue.

Harris County Precinct 3 operates the county parks. The 13-acre (53,000 m^{2}) Nob Hill Park, located at 10300 Timber Oak Drive, has a 0.59-mile (950 m) walking trail, a picnic, a playground, a gazebo, and a softball field. The 1-acre (4,000 m^{2}) Spring Branch Pocket Park, located at 1700 Campbell Road at Spring Branch Drive, has a 0.057-mile (92 m) trail, a playground, and a gazebo. The 1-acre (4,000 m^{2}) Housman Pocket Park, located at 6705 Housman Street, has a 0.12-mile (190 m) trail, a playground, and a gazebo. The 1-acre (4,000 m^{2}) Moritz Pech Family Park, located at 1493½ Moritz Drive, has two playgrounds and a 0.22-mile (350 m) granite jogging trail. The 1-acre (4,000 m^{2}) Creek Pocket Park, located at 1701 Creek Drive, has a 0.068-mile (0.109 km) trail. The 0.21-acre (850 m^{2}) Bracher Pocket Park, located at 1507½ Bracher Street, has a 0.057-mile (92 m) gravel trail, a playground, and a gazebo. The 0.65-acre (2,600 m^{2}) Bauer Pocket Park, located at 2201 Bauer Road, has a 0.1-mile (160 m) trail. The 1-acre (4,000 m^{2}) Gessner Pocket Park, located at 1610½ Gessner Drive, has a 0.025-mile (40 m) trail and a playground.

== Culture ==
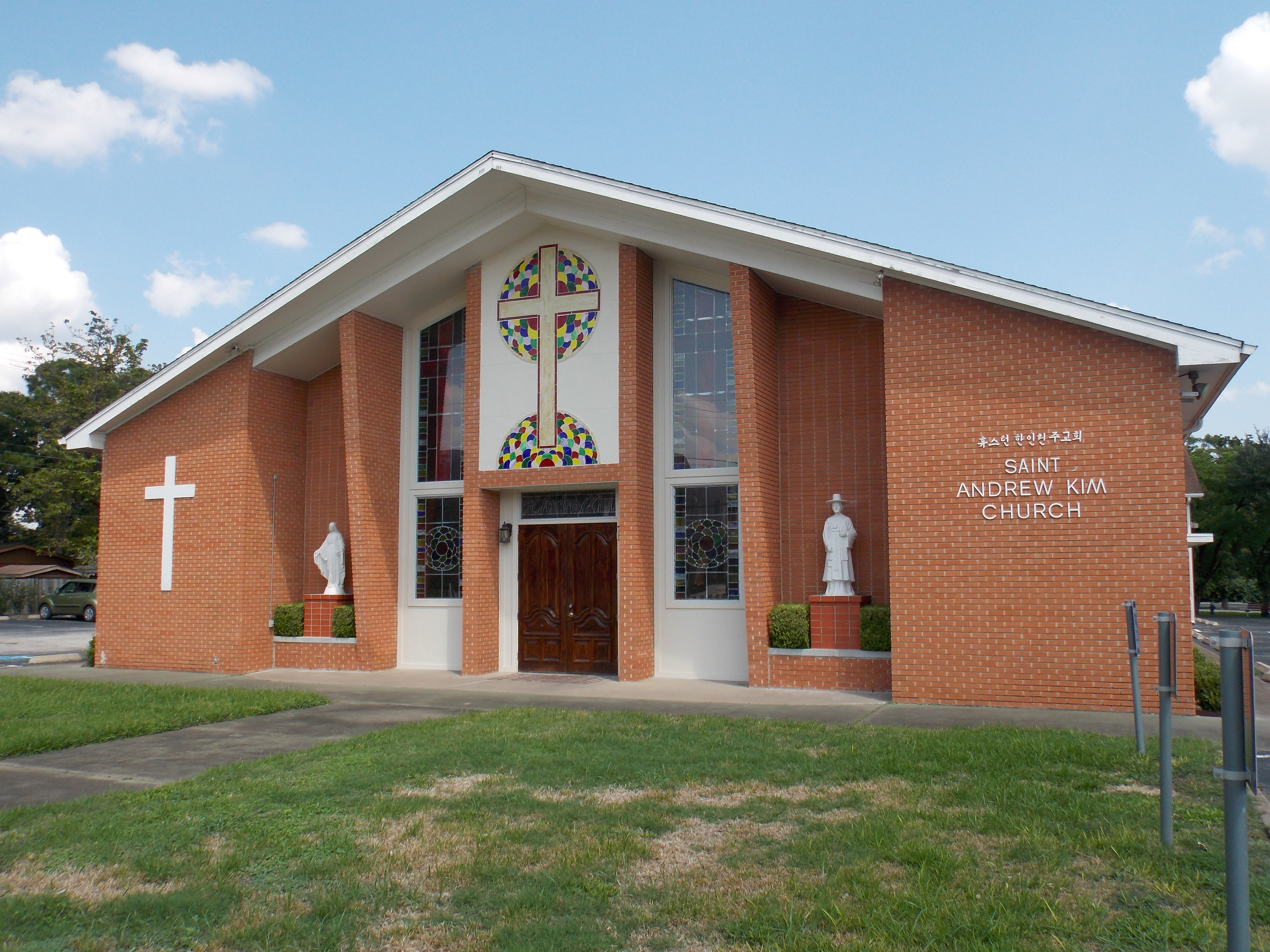
St. Andrew Kim Catholic Church (Korean: 휴스턴한인천주교회)

The Spring Branch Family Development Center, a 501(c)(3) organization, opened in 2001 to provide educational, recreational, health and social services to residents of Spring Branch.

The Roman Catholic Archdiocese of Galveston-Houston operates area Catholic churches. St. Andrew Kim Catholic Church (Korean: 휴스턴한인천주교회), named after Andrew Kim Taegon, is in Spring Branch. It serves ethnic Koreans and Korean speakers in the archdiocese. The area has a Polish American house of worship, Our Lady of Czestochowa Roman Catholic Parish, established in the 1980s. At the time Polish immigrants who resisted Communist rule in that country arrived in Houston. Other Spring Branch Catholic churches include Our Lady of Walsingham Church, St. Catherine of Siena Church, and St. Jerome Church.

The Islamic Society of Greater Houston (ISGH) operates an area house of worship for Muslims, the Spring Branch Islamic Center. It houses the Islamic primary school ILM Academy.

== Notable residents ==
- Helena Brown (former member of the Houston City Council in District A)

== See also ==
Central American communities:

- Gulfton, Houston - An area with a large Central American population

Korean communities:

- Koreatown, Manhattan
- Koreatown, Los Angeles
- New Malden, which is the center of the Korean community of London, England
