= The Rainard School =

Coordinates: 29.7923°N 95.5785°W

- Houston, TX; USA

Information
- Type: Independent
- Established: 1986
- Head of School: Dr. Tara Tomicic
- Faculty: 13
- Enrollment: 29
- Student to teacher ratio: 12:1 (lower school), 12:1 (middle school and high school)
- Campus: Urban
- Colors: Red, black and gold
- Mascot: Fox
- Website: http://www.rainard.org/

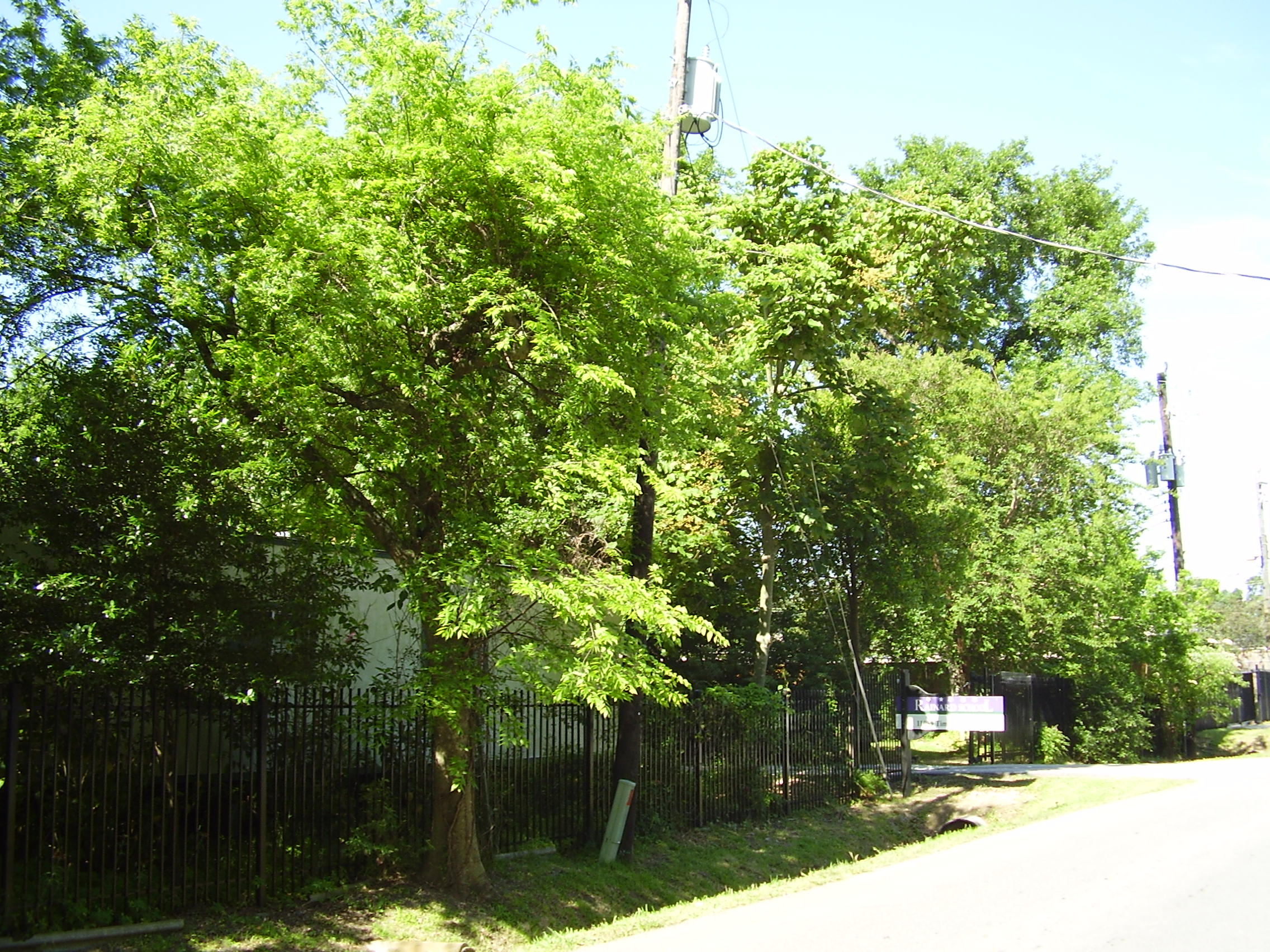
Entrance to The Rainard School

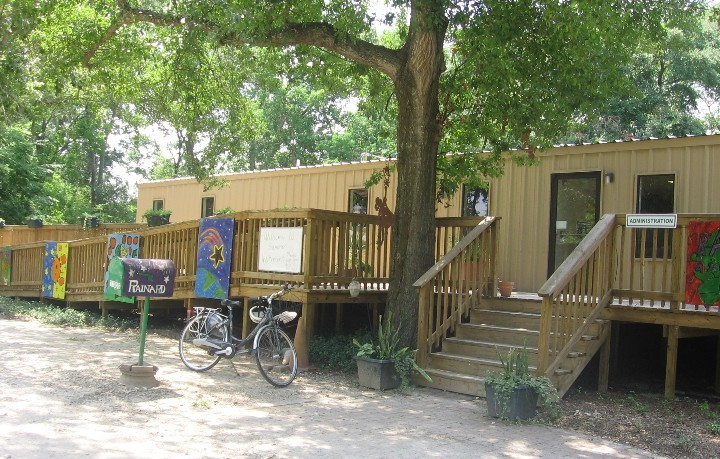
Rainard School administration building

Rainard School for Gifted Students is a private school located in Houston, Texas. Since its founding in 1986, Rainard has provided unique intellectual and creative opportunities to gifted students which it defines as those who "typically possess exceptional abilities and potential in one or more areas." The school currently offers enrollment from preschool through 8th grade.

The Rainard School for Gifted Students is located outside Beltway 8 and north of Interstate 10 in an outlying portion of western Houston, in an area known as Spring Branch.

== The school ==
Rainard was founded by Lorraine Bouchard, Ed D., in 1986. After 19 years at its former location at 13922 Old Katy Road, The Rainard School moved to a new four-acre wooded campus at 11059 Timberline in fall 2005. Purchased by Rainard in 2004, the campus was formerly that of The Parish School.

The school was renamed "Rainard School for Gifted Students" in 2010. The school is the only non-profit 501c(3) school in the Houston area totally devoted to gifted students.

In 1996, 2006, and 2015, respectively, it added a middle school, a high school, and a preschool. By 2019 its high school had closed and Rainard was now a K-8 school.

The current Head of School is Dr. Tara Tomicic.

== Curriculum ==
Gifted students require special individual curricula because of the imbalance between intellectual skills for their age and the social age skills and emotional age skills they possess. If their special needs are not met, these students are subject to various vulnerabilities that can result in the student not realizing their full potential or face significant social or emotional challenges.

Classes are multi-age, and multi-level to help address their asynchronous development with a given classroom spanning three to four traditional grade levels. The school has a target of a maximum 10 to 1 student-to-teacher ratio in the lower school and 9 to 1 in the middle school and high school. As of 2023, the school's total enrollment is approximately 34 students.

== Summer program ==
Rainard also offers a gifted and talented summer program called Summer Incitement for students from 3 1/2 years of age through 8th grade.
