= The Parish School =

School in Texas, United States

Coordinates: 29.811887°N 95.571589°W

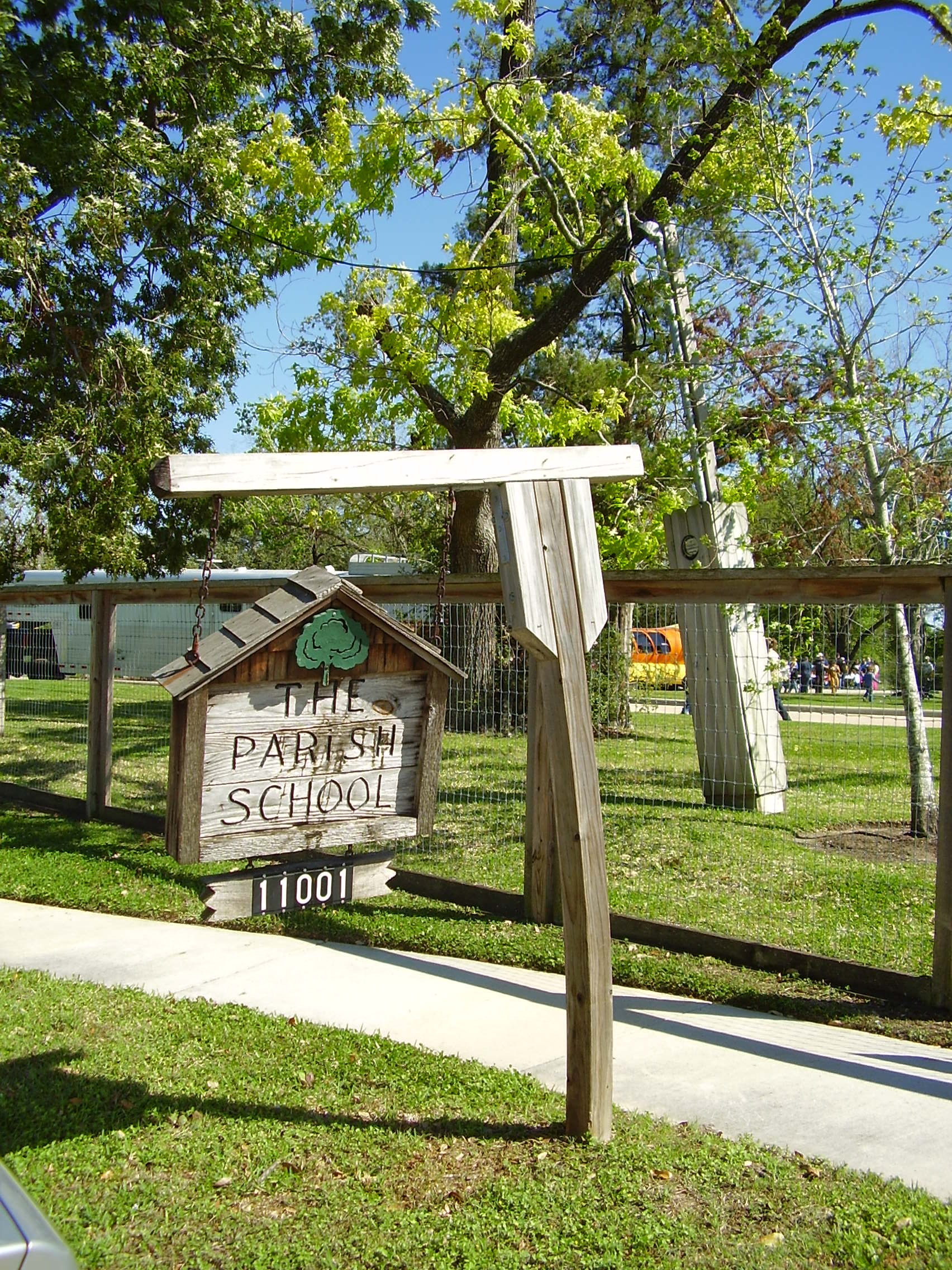

Location
- 11001 Hammerly Boulevard; Houston, Texas 77043; United States

Information
- Type: Special education
- Religious affiliation: Nonsectarian
- Established: 1983; 43 years ago
- Locale: Urban
- NCES School ID: A9106526
- President: Ashleigh Rickertsen
- Head of school: Anne Powers
- Teaching staff: 10.0 (FTE)
- Grades: Up to Grade 5
- Gender: Coeducational
- Age: 18 months to 12 years
- Enrollment: 129 (2023-2024)
  - Pre-kindergarten: 48
- Student to teacher ratio: 8.1
- Hours in school day: 7.2
- Accreditation: Cognia
- Tuition: US$48,910
- Website: parishschool.org

The Parish School is a private, early-intervention school for ages 2-12 with communication delays and learning differences.

The non-profit independent school serves children from developmentally 18 months to 12 years (or the fifth grade) who have average or above learning potential, but whose language, learning or communication differences impact their ability to be successful in a mainstream academic setting.

The Parish School is located outside of Beltway 8 and north of Interstate 10 in Houston, Texas, United States adjacent to the Spring Branch district.

The school is a part of the Houston Area Independent Schools.

== History ==
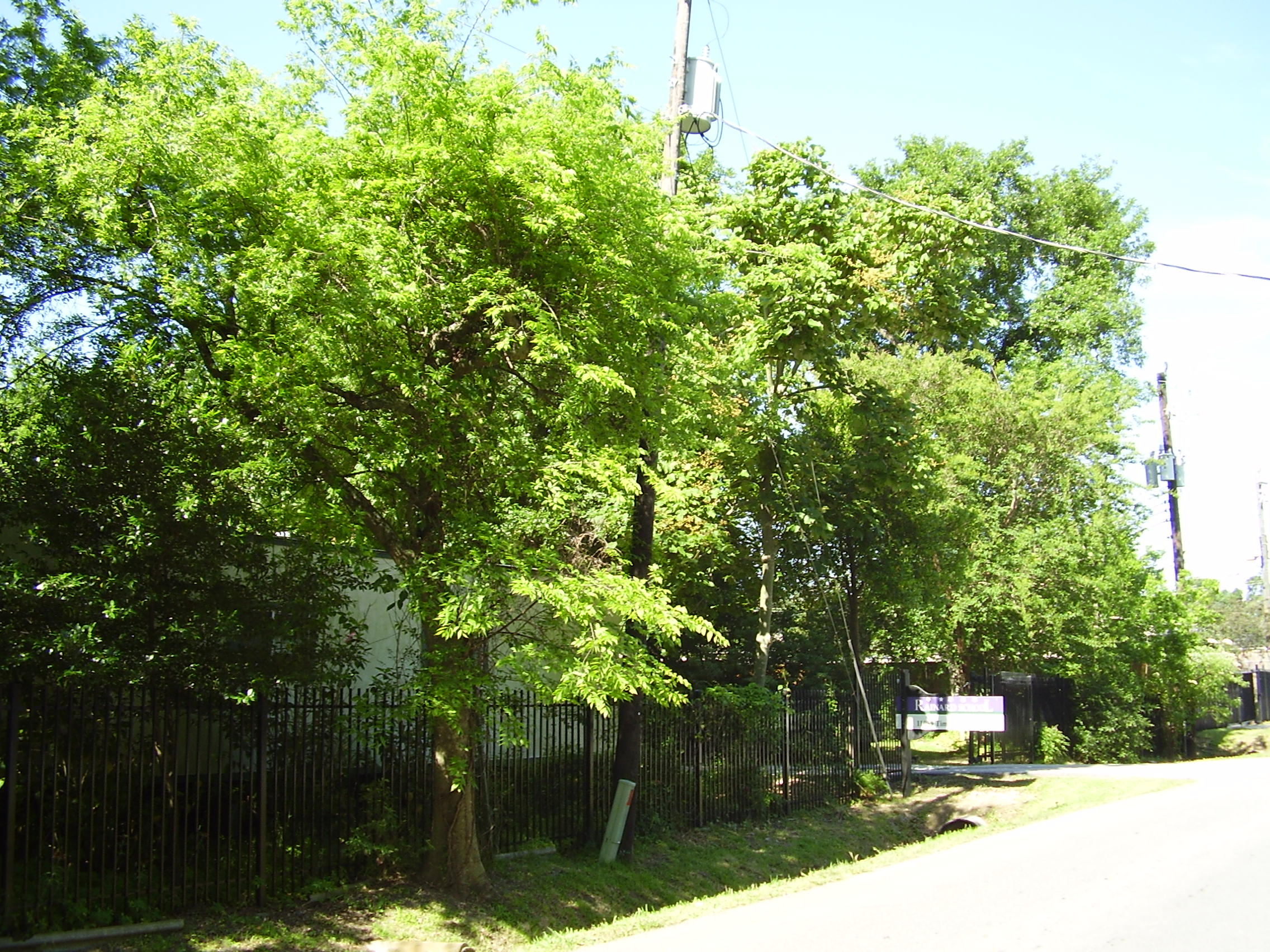
The former location of The Parish School as of 2008 houses The Rainard School

The Parish School was established in 1983 by Robbin Parish, M.A., CCC-SLP, a speech language pathologist. The school initially had six students. As its founder, Parish sought to create an environment where students with average or above cognitive skills, could receive therapeutic intervention to support their learning. The intent was to assist the student and his or her family to learn how the child learns best (visually, kinesthetically or auditorily), and to then use that strength to assist the child in their areas of focus.

Originally the school was located at a small lot at 11059 Timberline, but the school moved into a new 17-acre (69,000 m^{2}) campus at 11001 Hammerly in the Fall of 2005. The former site of The Parish School is, as of 2007, occupied by The Rainard School; Rainard moved from its Old Katy Road campus to the Timberline address after The Parish School moved to 11001 Hammerly.

The school planned for Parish's retirement party to occur on Saturday June 19, 2010. Parish died on Saturday June 12, 2010. The school opted to continue with its scheduled plans for the retirement party.

As of 2010 the school had 150 students, from 18 months to 12 years of age.

In January 2011 the University of Texas Medical School at Houston Children's Learning Institute began sending resident neurologists and pediatricians to The Parish School, making it a part of their training rotations.

The school is home to the Adventure Playground at the Parish School, one of the few permanent Adventure playgrounds in the United States.

On February 2, 2011 the school celebrated its first "Founder's Day" as a memorial to Parish.

In June 2011 Nancy Bewley, M.A.T., CCC-SLP, the principal, received the 2011 Tina E. Bangs Award by the Houston Association for Communication Disorders (HACD).

== Curriculum ==
The school uses teachers, speech therapists, counselors, and music therapists. The employees assist children with speech education, reading education, social skills education, the act of paying attention, and auditory and language processing. The school has low student to teacher ratios.

== School uniform ==
The Parish School requires its students to wear school uniforms.

All students must wear green or white polo shirts with the school's logo. All students may wear khaki trousers or shorts. In addition, girls may wear plaid skirts.
