= Factory 2-U =

Store chain in United States

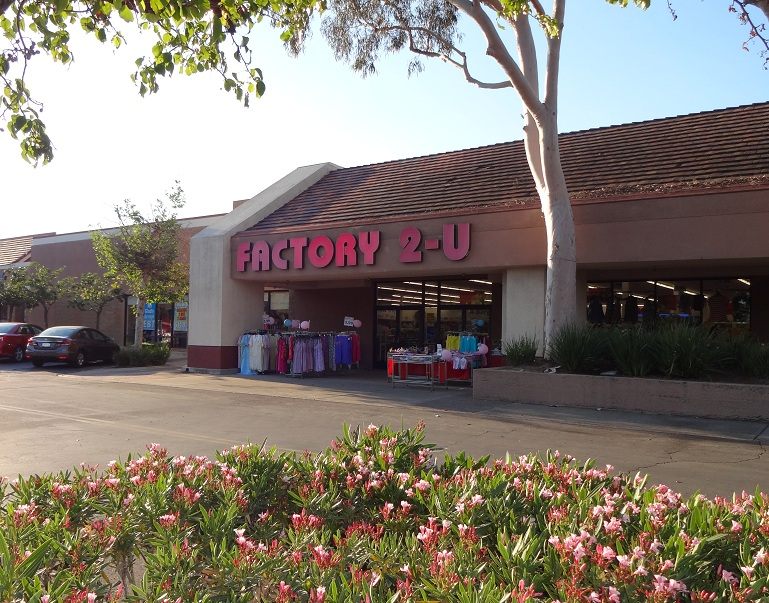
- Factory 2-U Store #653 Rancho Cucamonga, California
- Industry: Retail
- Products: Apparel
- Parent: National Stores
- Subsidiaries: Fallas Paredes
- Website: www.fallasstores.net

Factory 2-U was a chain of stores founded in 1962, operated by National Stores. The brand under National Stores sells off-brand apparel under the Factory 2-U name. Factory 2-U also operates stores under the name Fallas Paredes.

The chain was formerly operated by Factory 2-U Stores, Inc. which was headquartered in San Diego, California. The company was known for selling excess apparel and closeout merchandise from brands such as Converse, Gap, Levi's, and Polo Sport.

In 2003 the company Factory 2-U Stores operated locations in Alabama, Arizona (where it already had locations), Arkansas, California, Louisiana, Mississippi, Missouri, Nevada, New Mexico, Oklahoma, Oregon, Tennessee, Texas, and Washington. When Factory 2-U Stores filed for bankruptcy protection in February 2004, it arranged the sale of 172 stores to National Stores. In August 2004, Factory 2-U stores liquidated, receiving $28.5 million from the sale to Factory 2-U Liquidation LLC, a consortium headed by National Stores.
