= Helena Brown (politician) =

American politician

Member of Houston City Council for District A
- In office January 2012 – January 2014
- Preceded by: Brenda Stardig
- Succeeded by: Brenda Stardig

Personal details
- Born: 1977 or 1978 (age 48–49) California, U.S.
- Party: Republican
- Education: University of St. Thomas (BA)

Helena Brown (born 1977 or 1978) is an American politcian. She is the former representative for District A in the Houston City Council, representing the Spring Branch area of Houston, Texas. She was a part of the Tea Party movement.

== History ==
=== Early life ===
Brown was born in Southern California, in 1977 or 1978. At age four she moved with her family to Spring Branch, Houston. Brown lived in Houston City Council District A for almost all of her life. Brown's parents homeschooled her. She had served as the Republican Party chair of precinct #577, a 13-city block area, since age 18. Precinct chairs get their party's votes within their jurisdictions. Brown had volunteered for several Republican Party campaigns. In 2001, she graduated from the University of St. Thomas, gaining a Bachelor of Arts degree in history. In 2001 she started a nonprofit organization called Turris Davidica which aimed to distribute Roman Catholic religious media and assist needy people. In 2010 the organization defaulted on its charter. Emily DePrang of the Texas Observer said that the accomplishments of the organization were unclear.

According to the city administrator of Bunker Hill Village, a municipality in Greater Houston, Brown worked in the city government as a part-time receptionist for one year in 2007. The office of the Texas Secretary of State states that Brown had been a member-at-large of the Moritz Village Townhomes Association since 2007; her official website stated that she was the president of the association while her city council page on the City of Houston website said that she was a former president of the association.

=== Election ===
She was elected to her city council post in November 2011. She ran against Brenda Stardig and campaigned on a platform of fiscal conservatism. There was an 8% turnout in her district. Voters favored Brown because Stardig supported a "rain tax," passed in 2010, that taxed churches. The taxation of churches had a negative reception with political conservatives in Spring Branch. The voting base is politically conservative despite the presence of large Hispanic neighborhoods within District A. McCoy said that Stardig's re-election campaign was "ineffectual" so that also harmed her prospects.

Brown won the runoff election with 3,042 votes in December 2011. Since District A had 200,000 people, the winning votes represented fewer than 2% of the district's total population. Stardig had a ten-point loss. Emily DePrang of the Texas Observer said that Brown had been lucky because of circumstances which had been favorable for her. The city council post was the first political post which Brown had been elected to.

=== Political career ===
In January 2012 she took office. Chris Moran of the Houston Chronicle said that she "has stood out for her numerous "no" votes against spending and her tags to hold up other votes."

During her career she voted against many goods and services she characterized as being "luxury", opposing around 50% of the spending proposals in the city government. On many occasions she voted against proposals that every other council member voted on, making them 16–1. DePrang said "Brown made waves for her nearly satirical level of budget hawkery. She made simplistic government-bad, free-market-good speeches that evoked The Colbert Report to justify voting against funding meals for the elderly, storm sewers, and fire trucks." In order to end the budget deficit in the city government, Brown proposed outsourcing emergency services and defaulting on tax bonds and city pensions. Brown also became known for using tags, parliamentary procedures used to delay votes, with any rationale on agenda items so they occur one week later than without the tag. In February the city council admonished Brown and began overriding her tags; the previous such override occurred in the summer of 2011. Moran said that an override is very "unusual" and that it "generally is frowned upon as a break from council decorum." Brown named a man, William Park, as her "senior adviser." Park is a film producer who was previously involved in financial securities, but had been banned from the industry. Several former employees and critics accused Park of having de facto control over Brown's city council post and actions.

In 2012 Mario Diaz, the head of the Houston Airport System, invited her to travel to Korea to meet with airline representatives for expanding service into Houston. Brown's district has a large Korean American population. After the airlines cancelled the meetings, Diaz ended the Korea trip but Brown went anyway, spending $11,000 in public money on her airfare. Jessica Michan, the press secretary of the City of Houston, said that she never met airline representatives. Terrence McCoy of the Houston Press said "It's unclear what, if anything, Brown accomplished while in Asia." In 2012 Greg Groogan of the Fox O&O television station KRIV said that Brown "has been labeled both a hypocritical penny pincher and the bumbling puppet of a shady financier" and that she had "taken quite a beating in the local press". In an interview Brown said "I am very much my own person and as many who know me and watch me on city council I stick by my principles and I do not get bullied. I do not get pressured."

In 2014, Brown was replaced as Houston City Council representative for District A by Brenda Stardig following a December 2013 runoff election.
