= National Stores =

Defunct family-owned company headquartered in Los Angeles, California

National Stores Inc.
- Type: Private
- Traded as: Fallas Discount Stores
- Industry: Retail
- Founded: 1962; 64 years ago in Los Angeles, California
- Founder: Joseph Fallas
- Defunct: 2022; 4 years ago
- Fate: closure
- Headquarters: Harbor Gateway, Los Angeles, California
- Number of locations: 88 (at its height in 2020)
- Area served: United States, Puerto Rico
- Products: brand name clothing, private label clothing, shoes, household items
- Owner: Michael Fallas
- Number of employees: ≈2,200
- Website: Last snapshot of official Fallas website at the Wayback Machine (archived 2022-09-06)

National Stores Inc., was a family-owned company headquartered in the Harbor Gateway area of Los Angeles, California that had as many as 88 locations in 4 states and in Puerto Rico, and employed 2200 people nationwide in January 2022. As of 2023 National Stores Inc. no longer has any operating stores within the continental U.S.

National Stores Inc. had done business as: Fallas, Fallas Paredes, Fallas Discount Stores, Factory 2-U, Conway, Weiner's, CW Price, Falas (spelled with single "l" in Puerto Rico) and Anna's Linens by Fallas, and offers brand name and private label clothing for men, ladies, boys, girls, juniors, infants and toddlers along with lingerie, shoes and household items. Fallas Paredes had catered to the Hispanic American community.

== History ==
National Stores was started in 1962 by Joseph Fallas in a single downtown Los Angeles store as Fallas Paredes.

The most recent CEO and owner of National Stores is Joseph's son, Michael Fallas, who started working as a stock boy at age five.

=== Expansion ===
National Stores acquired 31 of the 97 Houston-area Weiner's store locations in 2001 when Weiner's began liquidation after filing for bankruptcy for the second time within five years.

National Stores acquired San Diego, California-based Factory 2-U Stores, Inc. when it filed for bankruptcy protection in February 2004 and arranged for the sale of 172 stores to National Stores. In August 2004, Factory 2-U stores liquidated, receiving $28.5 million from the sale to Factory 2-U Liquidation LLC, a consortium headed by National Stores.

National Stores acquired the Conway Stores chain in January 2014.

On August 27, 2015, National Stores performed a store lease takeover auction of 41 Anna's Linens store leases out of a debtor's sale. Some previously Anna's Linens stores in certain locations will be branded "Anna's Linens by Fallas" according to the intellectual property rights acquired by National Stores and will continue the basic Anna's Linen product offering.

=== Closings ===
In the second quarter of 2016, National Stores left a 600,000-square-foot regional distribution center in Otay Mesa, California and moved to a building development by Sares-Regis (SRG) in Perris, California, signing a $26 million 10-year lease, in an effort to realize a more centralized logistic location.

In August 2018, National Stores filed for chapter 11 bankruptcy protection with plans to close 74 of its 344 stores under a reorganization plan. The liquidation sales expanded to 184 Fallas and Factory 2-U stores starting in October 2018. National Stores began to close more Fallas Paredes stores in early 2022. The COVID epidemic was cited as the cause of some of the closings.

On August 31, 2022, National Stores closed all remaining locations throughout Puerto Rico and the contiguous United States as a result of further restructuring and liquidation of remaining assets.

=== Celebrity Endorsement ===
In November 2014, National Stores partnered with Mexican actress / musical artist Maite Perroni to introduce her Coleccion Maite Perroni, a contemporary fashion line inspired by her favorite designers reflecting her own personal taste.
