= Anna's Linens =

- Company type: Private
- Industry: Retail
- Founded: 1987; 39 years ago Los Angeles, California
- Founder: Alan Gladstone
- Defunct: 2015; 11 years ago
- Fate: Chapter 11 Bankruptcy
- Headquarters: Costa Mesa, California
- Number of locations: 252
- Area served: United States
- Products: Textiles, furniture

Anna's Linens was an American retailer. It was based in Costa Mesa, California.

== History ==
The company was founded in 1987 by Alan Gladstone, who named the store after his mother. The first location opened in Los Angeles, California.

In 1993, the chain filed for bankruptcy due to the poor economy of southern California at the time. It emerged from bankruptcy in December 1994.

The stores were stocked with household items, with merchandise sold at discounts. Stores were usually 10,000 square feet in size. It had more than 250 stores in 19 states.

In early 2012, it partnered with DDR Corp. to expand into Puerto Rico.

In 2015, the chain filed for Chapter 11 Bankruptcy with money owed to creditors in excess of 100 million dollars. Most locations closed, which allowed Five Below to expand into California with new stores opening at former Anna's locations in 2017.

On August 27, 2015, 41 store leases were taken over at auction out of a debtor's sale by National Stores Inc.

Some former Anna's Linens stores in certain locations were re-branded as "Anna's Linens by Fallas" and continued to use the basic Anna's Linens product offering. All remaining locations closed by 2022 following National Stores bankruptcy.

A member of its rewards program was known as a "Fan of Anna's."
