= Adventure Playground at the Parish School =

Park in Houston, Texas, United States

Coordinates: 29.8114°N 95.5720°W

Adventure Play at the Parish School
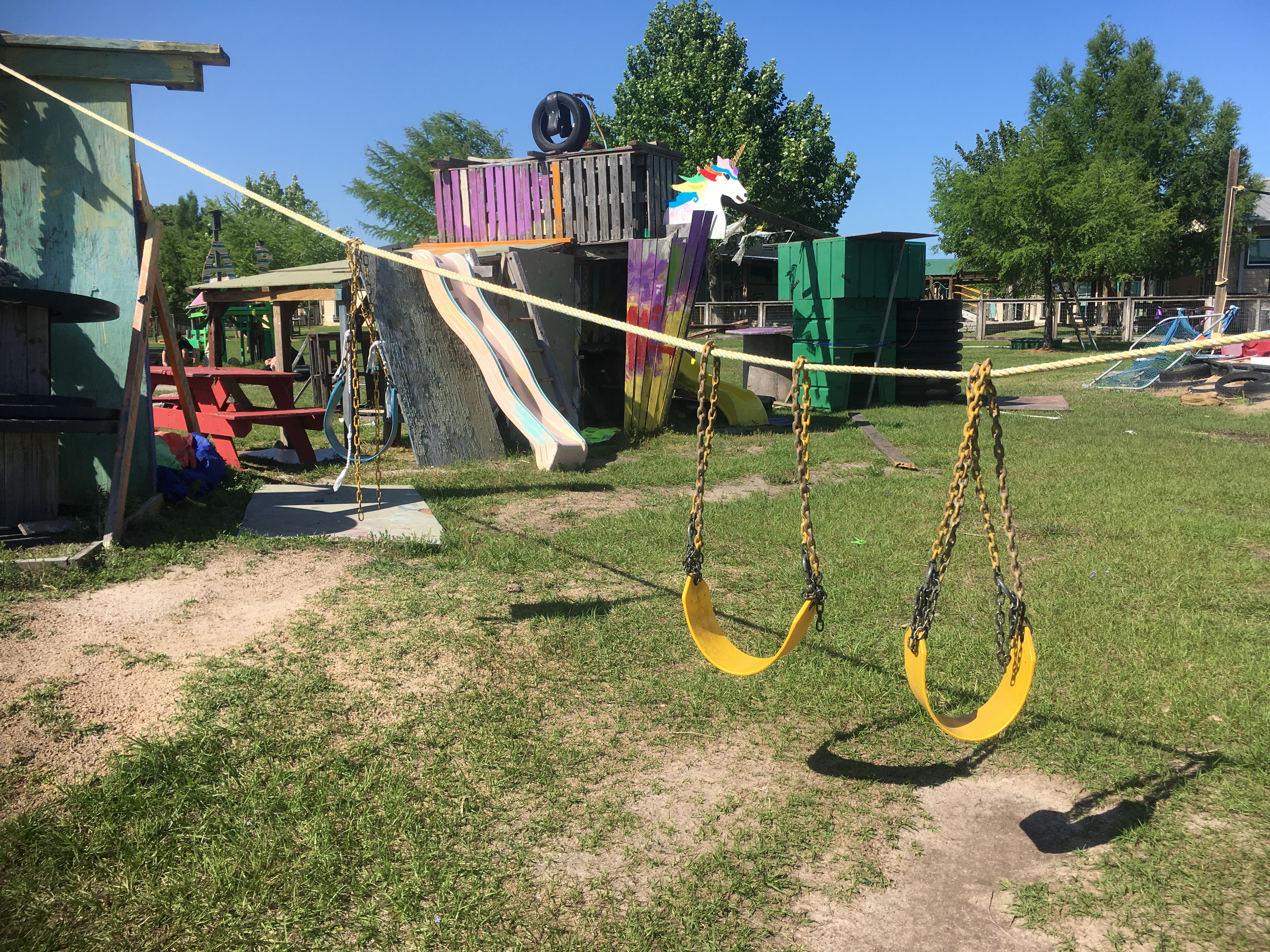
- Adventure Play at The Parish School
- Interactive map of Adventure Play at the Parish School
- Type: Adventure playground
- Location: The Parish School, 11001 Hammerly Blvd., Houston, TX 77043
- Nearest city: Houston, TX
- Area: 3 acres (1.2 ha)
- Open: To the public Monday-Thursday from 3:15 – 5:30 p.m.
- Website: Official website

Adventure Play at the Parish School is an adventure playground located in Houston, Texas. The Adventure Playground at the Parish School consists of a three-acre play area open to children from 6 to 12 years old. It is one of the few junk playgrounds located in the United States, and the only one located in a school. The playground serves children with communication disorders and language and learning differences, often including difficulties interacting with peers. (Note: The Parish School adventure playground is the only adventure playground in the United States that specifically serves children with communication and learning differences, such as auditory and other sensory processing differences, autism, attention deficit hyperactivity disorder, dyslexia, dysgraphia, or childhood apraxia of speech.Wood, Jill (2017). "Playing in the After School Program The Parish School, Houston, TX". In Almon, Joan (ed.). Playing It Up With Loose Parts, Playpods, and Adventure Playgrounds. Alliance for Childhood. pp. 102–108. ISBN 978-1-542-85937-0.)

== Adventure playground ==
The adventure playground at the Parish School was started in 2008 with a sand-pile and two cement culverts. The three-acre play-area now contains a zip-line, shade structures, and an expanse of grassy floodplain, with natural features (dirt, grass, sticks), wildlife, and various scavenged construction materials, other recyclables, lumber, pipes, fabric and rope. Children also have access to tools (hammers and nails, hand drills and saws, shovels and post-hole diggers) for building structures out of recycled building materials. Many of these materials are collected from the Building Materials Reuse Warehouse, a part of the City of Houston's Solid Waste Management Department.

The idea is that children can create whatever they want on the adventure playground. It's a child-directed environment. — Jill Wood, Director of Adventure Play at The Parish School, PlayGroundology & Houston MediaSource

The Adventure Playground at the Parish School is staffed by playworkers.

== Research site ==
The Adventure Playground at the Parish School has been the site of several academic studies. These have concerned landscape design and comparisons of injury rates between conventional adult-designed-and-built playgrounds and child-designed-and-built junk playgrounds, or risky playgrounds. For example, comparing injury rates between two playground types, Wood and Leichter-Saxby (2016) found that the location with the fewest incidents was the child-built adventure playground. In a statistical study of risky play at the Parish School, which compared injury rates there to other activities, Leichter-Saxby and Wood (2018) found that play on the school's adventure playground was slightly riskier than snooker and safer than table tennis. Playing on conventional fixed equipment at school recess was riskier than golf, but safer than being at home. Adventure play was safer than play on conventional playground equipment, but each carried an extremely low risk of serious injury.
