= Weiner's =

Former American clothing retailer

- Industry: Retail
- Founded: 1926; 100 years ago
- Founder: Isidore Weiner
- Defunct: 2001; 25 years ago
- Fate: Bankruptcy
- Headquarters: Spring Branch, Houston, Texas, U.S.
- Products: Clothing

Weiner's Stores, Inc., was a clothing retailer with its headquarters in Spring Branch and in Houston, Texas.

== History ==
Weiner's was founded by Isidore Weiner in 1926. Weiner was an immigrant from Vilnius, Lithuania. The first shop was located on what was then the outskirts of Houston. In 1932 the firm filed for bankruptcy during the Great Depression.

Greg Hassell and Deidra M. Lemons of the Houston Chronicle said that Weiner's achieved "its zenith" in 1994, when it had 158 locations. Its locations were in Texas and Louisiana. In 1995 the company received a lot of debt and began cutting locations. It filed for Chapter 11 bankruptcy in April 1995, ended 27 locations, and unloaded $40 million worth of old merchandise that was in its warehouses. In August 1997 the company emerged from bankruptcy protection. The store chain itself had a hard time competing against big box retailers that were rapidly expanding into the area like Walmart and Target, and also with the advent of online shopping and the rise of household Internet use, Weiner's also suffered as they were slow to adopt online retail.

In October 2000, the company declared bankruptcy again. The company announced that it was closing 44 of the 141 stores that it was operating at the time. The bankruptcy protection filing was due to decreasing sales of name brand products. According to Weiner's spokesperson Lee Butler, since 1995, Weiner's had not achieved profitability at all. The Houston Business Journal said in an editorial that Weiner's "struggled to emerge from the shadows of big-box competitors like Wal-Mart and Target, which attracted customers with one-stop retail shopping." In 2001 Weiner's announced that it was changing its name to Weiner's Plus. The clothing line was always competitive with its lower quality peers. Trying to extract value from essentially rather mediocre product lines. This began to be more and more apparent as the store became squeezed by competitors. The veil of substandard and in many ways outright cheap quality was exposed during this period. Bankruptcy became the obvious alternative as those with an appetite for higher quality and an appreciation for the manufacturing origin and sales of such products became more evident.

On June 26, 2001, the company announced that it was liquidating; all 97 of its stores would close, and all 2,900 employees would be laid off. Tropical Storm Allison, which had flooded seven of its stores, was the final factor that caused the liquidation, since the company did not have flood insurance. At the time of liquidation the company had 97 stores in four states, including 24 stores in Houston and 9 stores in other places in Greater Houston. Some of the 200 people working at the company headquarters and distribution center were laid off on the Tuesday that the announcement was made.

After Weiner's closed, National Stores (Fallas Paredes) took over many of the store locations that were held by Weiner's. National Stores acquired 31 of the 97 Houston-area Weiner's leases.
