= Cy-Fair Volunteer Fire Department =

Fire department in Harris County, Texas, U.S.

Cy-Fair Fire Department

Operational area
- Country: United States
- State: Texas
- County: Harris

Agency overview
- Established: 1962
- Annual calls: ~30,000 (2020)
- Employees: ~330 Employees (2017) ~290 Volunteers (2017)
- Annual budget: $29.5 Million (2020)
- Staffing: Combination
- Fire chief: Amy Ramon
- EMS level: ALS

Facilities and equipment
- Battalions: 3
- Stations: 13
- Engines: 13 - Front Line; 4 - Reserve
- Trucks: 2
- Platforms: 2 - Front Line; 1 - Reserve
- Rescues: 3 - Front Line; 1 - Reserve
- Ambulances: 13 - Front Line; 5 - Reserve
- Tenders: 2
- Wildland: 7
- Rescue boats: 7

Website
- cyfairfd.org

The Cy-Fair Fire Department provides fire protection and emergency medical services to unincorporated areas of Harris County, Texas. The department primarily serves the communities of Cypress and Fairbanks which are collectively known as Cypress-Fairbanks or Cy-Fair since. Cy-Fair Fire Department serves over 500,000 people over a 155-square-mile (400 km^{2}) area and responds to more than 27,000 incidents each year.

Cy-Fair Fire Department is a combination department utilizing volunteers, full-time and part-time paid crews. During the standard week seven to eight engines, one heavy-rescue truck, and two aerial trucks are crewed with a combination of volunteer and career staffing in order to provide a timelier response. Cy-Fair's Medic Units are staffed with full-time employees 24 hours a day, year-round.

== Stations and Apparatus ==
The department has 13 fire stations spread across their response area.

Fire Station Number	Address	Engine Company	Ladder Company or Tower Company	Medic Unit	Wildland Unit	Other Units	District
1	9201 Rodney Ray	Engine 1		Medic 1	Booster 1		1
2	13040 Wortham Center Dr.	Engine 2	Ladder 2	Medic 2		Advanced Practice Paramedic 2, Transporter 2	1
3	11827 Telge Road	Engine 3		Medic 3	Dozer 3	Rescue 3 (Heavy), Rescue Boat 3	2
4	18006 Huffmeister Rd	Engine 4		Medic 4	Booster 4, Fire Gator 4	Tanker 4	2
5	17819 Kieth Harrow Blvd.	Engine 5		Medic 5		Rescue 5	3
6	6404 N Eldridge	Engine 6		Medic 6	Booster 6		1
7	20444 Cypresswood Drive	Engine 7	Tower 7	Medic 7	Booster 7	Rescue Boat 7	2
8	18210 FM 529 West	Engine 8		Medic 8	Booster 8	Rescue 8 (Heavy), Rescue Boat 8	3
9	7188 Cherry Park Dr.	Engine 9	Tower 9	Medic 9		Advanced Practice Paramedic 9	2
10	11310 Steeplecrest	Engine 10		Medic 10		Transporter 10	1
11	18134 West Road	Engine 11		Medic 11	Booster 11	Fire Boat 11, EMS Gator	3
12	19780 Keith Harrow Boulevard	Engine 12		Medic 12	Booster 12	Tanker 12	3
13	10222 Westgreen Boulevard	Engine 13	Ladder 13	Medic 13		EMS District Chief 13, Transporter 13	3
Communications Center	9101 Wheat Cross					Mobile Command Vehicle 1 (MCV1)	
