= Cabela's =

American outdoor recreational equipment retail chain

Cabela's Inc.

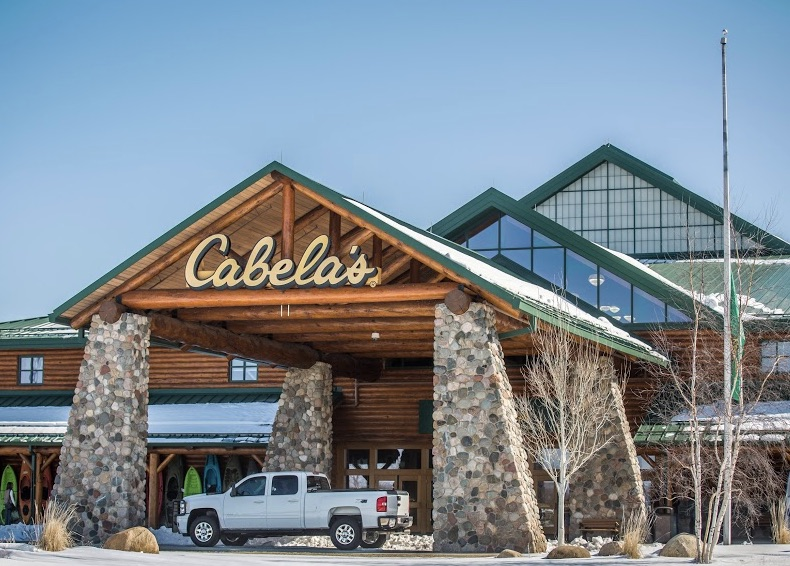
- Cabela's in Rogers, Minnesota
- Type: Subsidiary (Public until 2017)
- Industry: Retail
- Founded: December 14, 1961 (64 years ago) in Chappell, Nebraska, U.S.
- Founders: Richard N. Cabela; Jim Cabela
- Headquarters: Sidney, Nebraska, U.S.
- Number of locations: 49 (2025)
- Key people: Thomas Millner (CEO)
- Products: Hunting, fishing, outdoor merchandise
- Number of employees: 19,100 (2016)
- Parent: Bass Pro Shops (2017–present)
- Subsidiaries: White River Marine Group
- Website: www.cabelas.com

Cabela's Inc. is an American retailer that specializes in hunting, fishing, boating, camping, and other outdoor recreation merchandise. The chain was founded by Richard N. Cabela and Jim Cabela in 1961. Cabela's was acquired by Springfield, Missouri-based Bass Pro Shops in 2017 and has been a subsidiary since then. The brand's retail locations feature wildlife exhibits and outdoor designs, and are viewed as tourist attractions.

== History ==
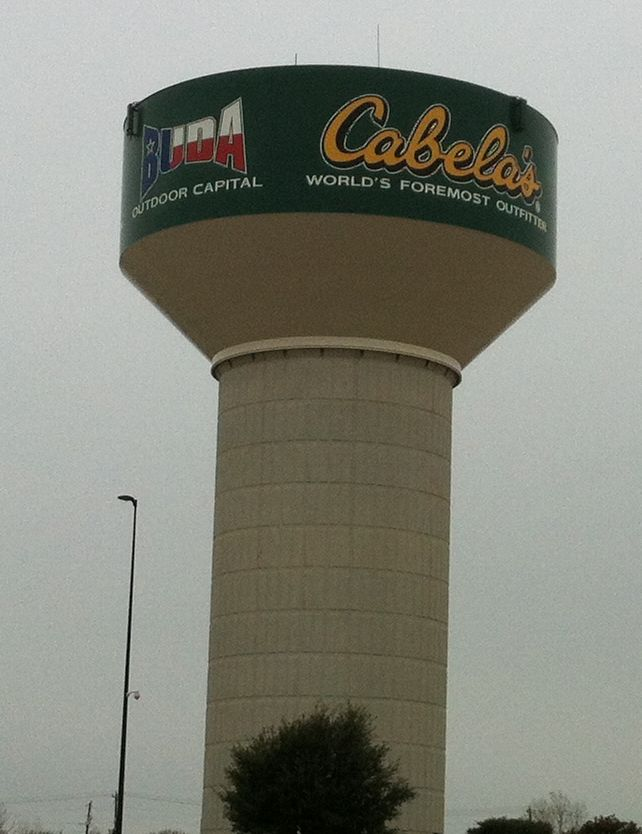
Water tower at Buda, Texas, bearing company advertisement next to a Cabela's store

The company that would become a sporting goods reseller and chain was started in December 1961 in Chappell, Nebraska. Richard (Dick) N. Cabela purchased $45 worth of fishing flies at a furniture expo in Chicago which he then advertised for sale in a local newspaper advertisement. When his first effort produced only one response, he placed an ad in a national magazine, Sports Afield, which was more successful. Cabela and his wife, Mary, mailed the orders and kept a record of all names and addresses.

In 1963, Cabela's brother Jim joined the company. The mimeographed catalog became a printed catalog, and the operation moved into the basement of a family store and then to a former American Legion Hall. In 1968, the company moved again into a former John Deere dealer facility in Sidney, Nebraska. Cabela's then sold fishing gear as well as equipment for hunting, backpacking, and other outdoor activities. In 1991, a 75,000-square-foot retail store was opened in Sidney. More stores were built, decorated with outdoor scenery, mounted animals, and aquariums. Some stores included shooting ranges and archery ranges. By 2014, there were 50 stores across the U.S. and Canada.

On February 17, 2014, founder Dick Cabela died at his home in Sidney, Nebraska, at the age of 77.

About half of Cabela's sales come from hunting-related merchandise with about a third derived from the sale of firearms, ammunition and accessories in 2012. Additionally, in 2012 30% of revenue came from direct sales (through catalog and online orders), and 59% from physical retail stores. The remaining 11% of revenue came from its financial subsidiary and credit card business.

In 1996, Gander Mountain, prior to declaring bankruptcy, sold its mail order business to Cabela's with a non-compete clause. In 2007, Cabelas brought suit against them to prevent their re-entry into the mail-order business. Gander Mountain won the lawsuit and began selling online as well.

In February 2013, Cabela's sued Gander Mountain for patent infringement over a fold-up cot that Gander was selling. In December 2013, Gander sued Cabela's for cybersquatting. In March 2014, Cabela's sold their recreational real estate division, Cabela's Trophy Properties, to Sports Afield. The name changed to Sports Afield Trophy Properties. In January 2016, Cabela's sold their Outdoor Adventures & T.A.G.S. divisions to Worldwide Trophy Adventures. On October 3, 2016, Bass Pro Shops announced an agreement to acquire Cabela's for $5.5 billion. In September 2017, Cabela's became part of Bass Pro Shops.

In October 2026, Cabela's was included in the 2026 Forbes Best Customer Service list.

== Retail stores ==
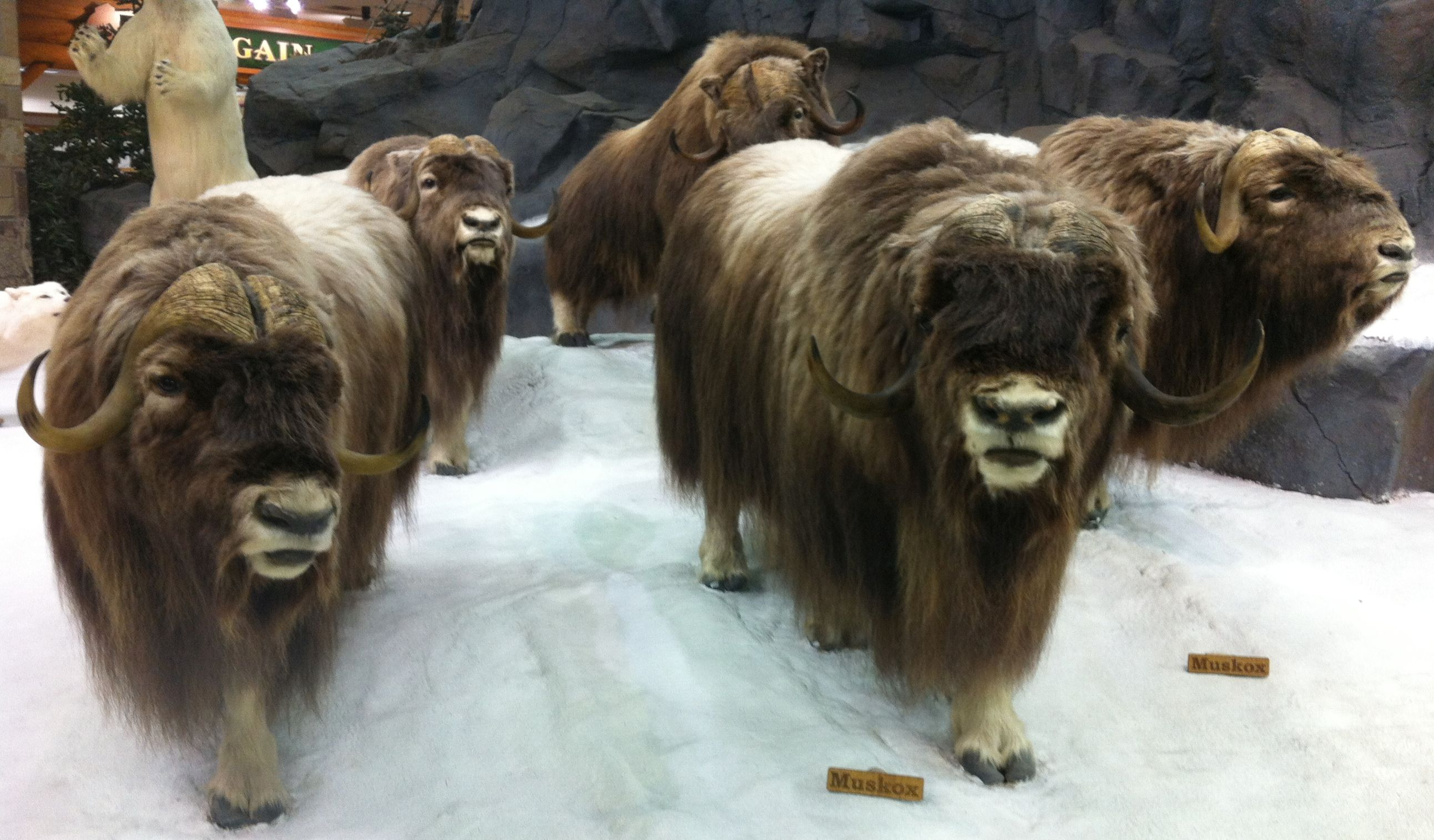
Musk oxen mounted and on display at store in Buda, Texas

The largest Cabela's retail facility is in Hamburg, Pennsylvania, with more than 250,000 square feet (23,000 m^{2}) of floor space.

In 2007, Cabela's purchased family-owned S.I.R. Warehouse Sports Store in Winnipeg. In 2010, the Canadian Head Office and Distribution Centre moved across the city, leaving the original location as only a retail store. The company had intended to be a part of the 1,400,000-square-foot (130,000 m^{2}) Lac-Mirabel project near Montreal, which was to include 220,000 square feet (20,000 m^{2}) of retail space, and was planned to open in 2008. But instead, Bass Pro Shops became one of the mall anchors. In 2011 Cabela's opened a 70,000-square-foot (6,500 m^{2}) store in Edmonton, Alberta and a 50,000-square-foot (4,600 m^{2}) store opened in Saskatoon in 2012 another 70,000-square-foot (6,500 m^{2}) store in Calgary, Alberta opened in 2015.

Gun Library

In late 2011, Cabela's announced a new retail initiative called Cabela's Outpost Store was located in Union Gap, Washington, while the second was opened in Saginaw County, Michigan. The Outposts have seasonally rotating merchandise, online order kiosks, and in-store pickup.

As of January 2024, there were 70 Cabela's stores in the U.S. and 10 in Canada. Many of these stores were rebranded as Bass Pro Shops throughout the following year. 49 stores remained with the Cabela's branding as of April 2025.

== Acquisition by Bass Pro Shops ==
On July 5, 2017, the Federal Trade Commission approved the acquisition of Cabela's by Bass Pro Shops. The acquisition was complete on September 25, 2017. The two brands have a few things in common: they were founded around the same theme and both brand's store locations were designed to deliver a "destination-like" shopping experience. Cabela's and Bass Pro Shops locations have also doubled as wildlife exhibits and draw in many tourists. A Cabela's in Michigan saw 6 million visitors a year and was the state's largest tourist destination.

== Sponsorships ==
Cabela's Legendary Adventures sponsored Richard Childress Racing driver Daniel Hemric during the 2019 Monster Energy NASCAR Cup Series in partnership with Bass Pro Shops. Cabela's previously had a deck lid space on Martin Truex Jr.'s Bass Pro Shops car, now a logo on his race suit. They co-sponsor the No. 31 car driven by Ryan Newman.

In 2019, Cabela's became a sponsor of Project Childsafe, a National Shooting Sports Foundation program that promotes safe firearms handling and responsible storage. Cabela's has also been the official retailer of SHOT Show Industry Day at the Range.

Other sponsorships include Safari Club International, National Archery in the Schools Program, Project Childsafe, & the Catch a Dream Foundation.

== Outreach ==
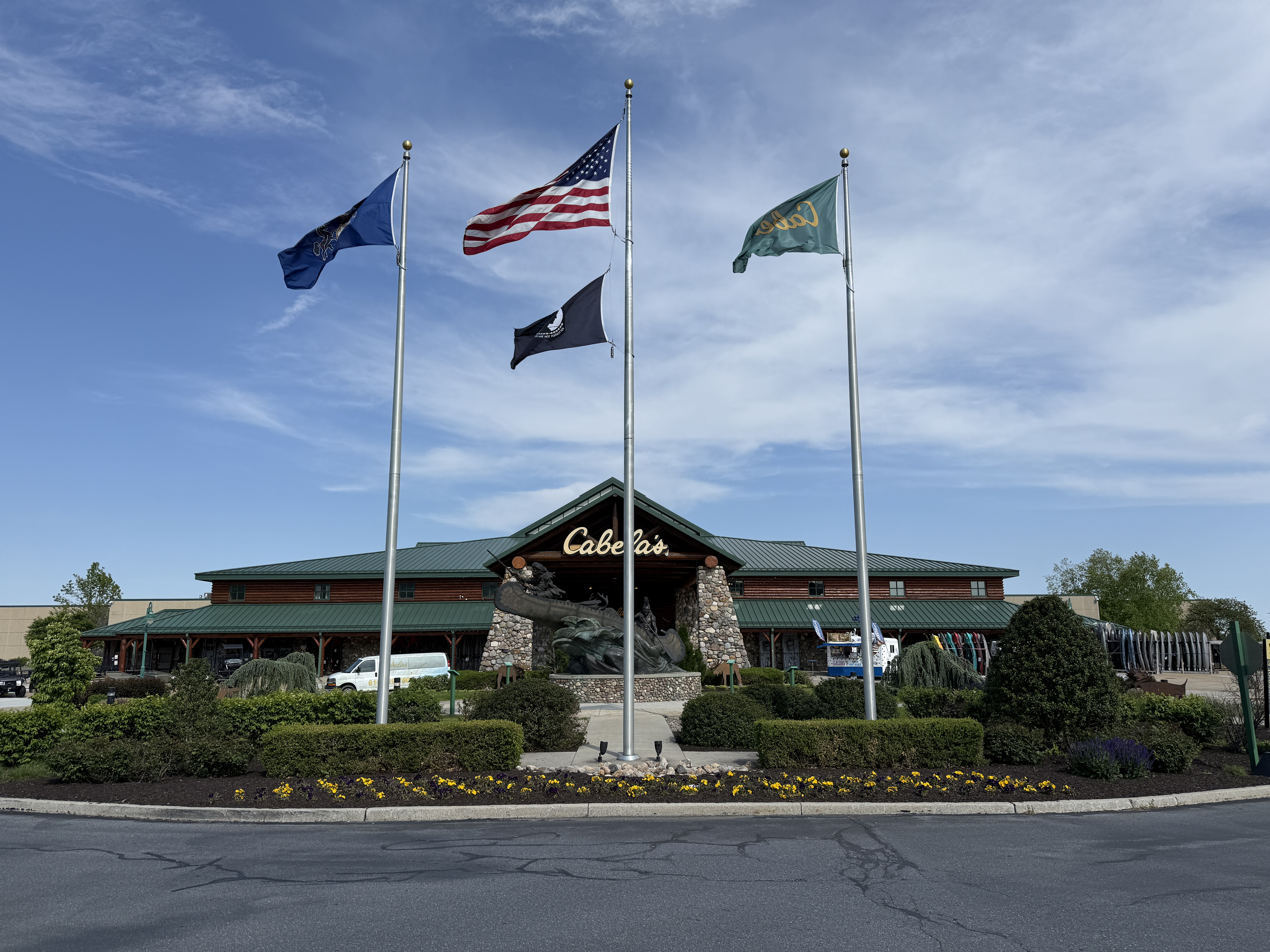
Cabela's in Hamburg, Pennsylvania

Cabela's works with different organizations focused on military and Veteran support and conservation.

=== Military and Veteran Support ===
Cabela's has supported Helping a Hero, Folds of Honor, All Secure Foundation, and Hiring a Hero.

==== Proud Veteran Outfitter Vest Program ====
In 2023, Bass Pro Shops and Cabela's started the Proud Veteran Outfitter Vest Program and provided Veteran Outfitters (those who work at Bass Pro Shops and Cabela's) with vests they can wear to work that include their name, military branch and rank, and the U.S. flag. The vests were presented during a ceremony that recognized each veteran.

==== Legendary Salute Discount ====
The Legendary Salute Discount is Cabela's and Bass Pro Shops' discount program and offers a 10% discount on most things in the stores to active military, veterans, retirees, guard, reservists, law enforcement officers, firefighters, paramedics and wildlife agents.

=== Conservation ===
==== Bass Pro Shops and Cabela's Outdoor Fund ====
The Outdoor Fund is a 501(c)(3) nonprofit. Customers at Bass Pro Shops and Cabela's can donate to it by choosing to round up their purchases to support different conservation partners and projects.

Partners and recipients of donations include:

- Casting for Recovery
- The Coastal Prairie Conservancy
- Elks PTSD Veteran's Fly Tying and Casting Program
- Farmers and Hunters Feeding the Hungry
- Forests Ontario
- The George H.W. Bush Vamos A Pescar Education Fund
- Jonathan Dickinson State Park.
- Kentucky State Police - Trooper Island (free children's summer camp)
- National Archery in the School Program (NASP)
- The National Wild Turkey Federation
- Outdoors Tomorrow Foundation

== Video games ==
Cabela's has produced several series of video games for a variety of gaming platforms, including Cabela's Legendary Adventures, Cabela's Big Game Hunter series, Cabela's Dangerous Hunts series, and Cabela's Outdoor Adventures series.

== Banking and finance ==
Founded in 2001, the World's Foremost Bank is a subsidiary of Cabela's. It is based in Sidney, Nebraska.

The subsidiary consisted of a single-branch bank with a deposit market share in the state of Nebraska of just under 1.2 percent, with $505 million in deposits as of 2011. At the end of 2012, the bank claimed to have $3,731,567,000 in assets. Sean Baker was appointed president of World's Foremost Bank and chief executive officer on January 1, 2013. Baker replaced Joseph M. Friebe, whose planned retirement was announced in June 2012.

=== 2011 FDIC settlement ===
In 2011, Cabela's World's Foremost Bank agreed to pay $10.1 million in restitution and a $250,000 fine as part of a settlement agreement with the Federal Deposit Insurance Corporation (FDIC). The bank did not admit any wrongdoing in the agreement, but did agree to change certain practices.

=== 2011 Royal Bank of Canada loan ===
The Bank entered into a $411.7 million commitment with the Royal Bank of Canada under a series of variable funding notes issued by Cabela's Credit Card Master Note Trust. The loan is for three years and accrues interest at a variable rate of commercial paper plus a spread.

=== 2017 World's Foremost Bank Sale & Capital One ===
As part of the merger with Bass Pro Shops, Cabela's sold the World's Foremost Bank aspect of their business, including over $1 billion in assets, to Synovus Financial Corp. and Capital One Financial Corp. After the deal was completed, Synovus planned to sell the credit card assets and related liabilities to Capital One Bank (USA) NA.

== See also ==
- Academy Sports + Outdoors
- Bass Pro Shops
- Dick's Sporting Goods
- Legendary Whitetails
- Scheels
- Sportsman's Warehouse
- List of S&P 400 companies
- List of Nebraska companies
