= Sports Afield Trophy Properties =

- Company type: Privately held company
- Industry: Real Estate Marketing
- Predecessor: Cabela's Trophy Properties
- Founded: February 2004 in Sidney, Nebraska
- Headquarters: Huntington Beach, CA
- Parent: Sports Afield
- Website: http://sportsafieldtrophyproperties.com/

Sports Afield Trophy Properties, formerly Cabela's Trophy Properties, LLC. is an independent real estate listing subsidiary of Sports Afield, an outdoors magazine. It was founded as Cabela's Trophy Properties, LLC by Cabela's, American specialty retailer of outdoor merchandise. Cabela's sold the service to Sports Afield in 2014.

== History ==
Launched in February 2004, Cabela's Trophy Properties “grew out of Cabela's CEO Dennis Highby's own frustration a few years before when he was looking for recreational property to buy and couldn't find any national listing service for such property.” Cabela's Trophy Properties did not directly engage in real estate transactions, instead operating as a recreational-listing service for an exclusive network of recreational brokers.

In 2007, the Montana Wildlife Federation (MWF) waged a public campaign against Cabela's over its Cabela's Trophy Properties recreational real estate listing subsidiary and the perceived effect on hunter access in Montana. The controversy was sparked by the sale of several properties including key wildlife habitats, including the Weaver Ranch located north of Winnett, Montana. The Weaver Ranch had been part of Montana's Block Management Program (BMP), which compensates farmers and ranchers for providing public access to hunters.

The Montana Wildlife Federation argued that sales of recreational property often resulted in the withdrawal of the land from programs such as BMP, ultimately eliminating public access. Following discussions with MWF and other groups, Cabela's Trophy Properties in 2008 changed its approach to marketing its services and pledged to encourage public access and conservation.

In March 2014, Cabela's Trophy Properties was acquired by outdoor magazine Sports Afield, effectively ending Cabela's operations in real estate sales. Ironically, Richard Cabela, founder of Cabela's, would credit his first advertisement in Sports Afield magazine for helping him create the volume of sales necessary to later establish the company. Following its acquisition, Cabela's Trophy Properties was rebranded as Sports Afield Trophy Properties.
