= Greater Houston =

Coordinates: 29°45′46″N 95°22′59″W

- Metropolitan statistical area
- Houston–Pasadena–The Woodlands, Texas metropolitan statistical area
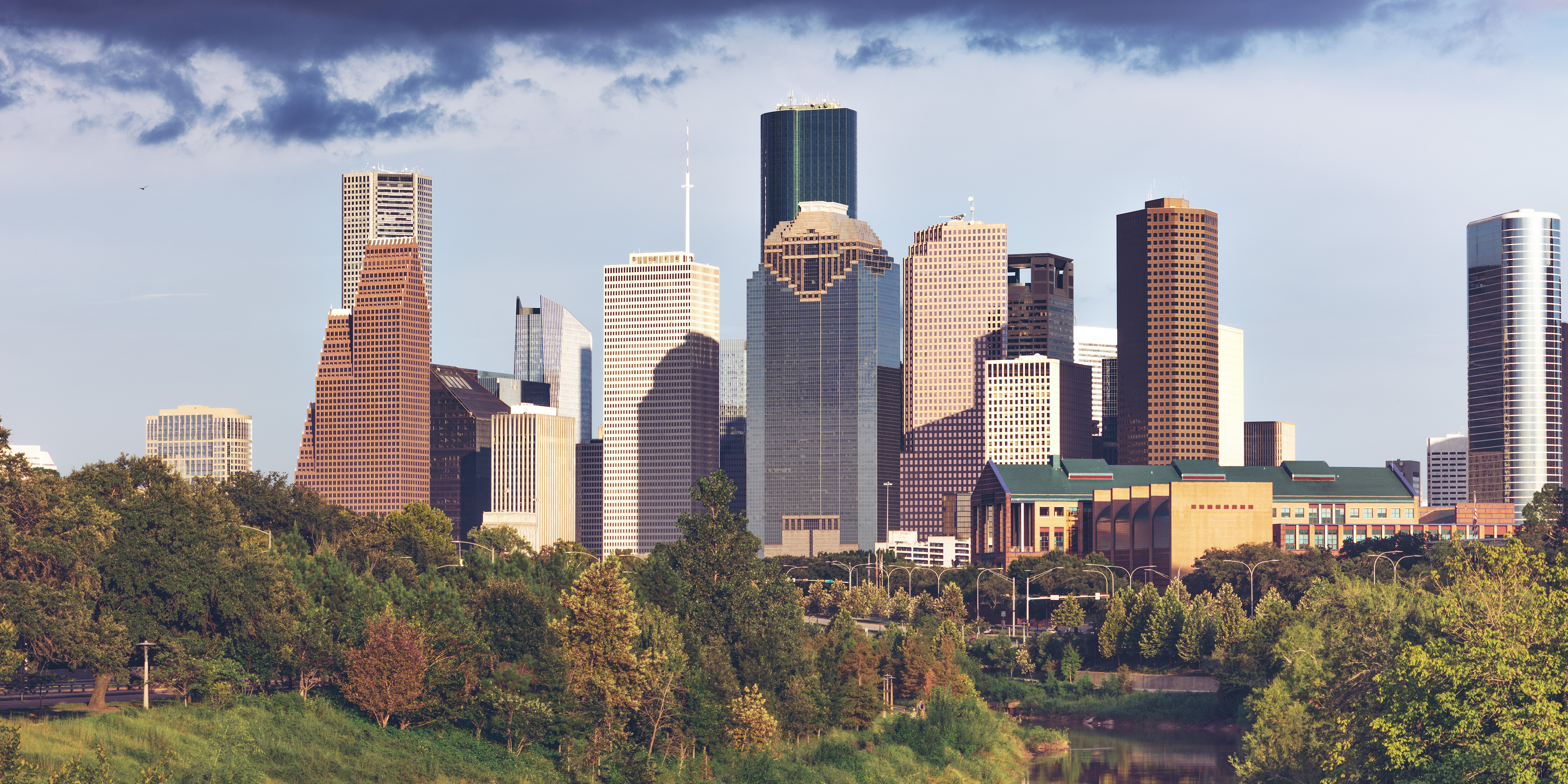
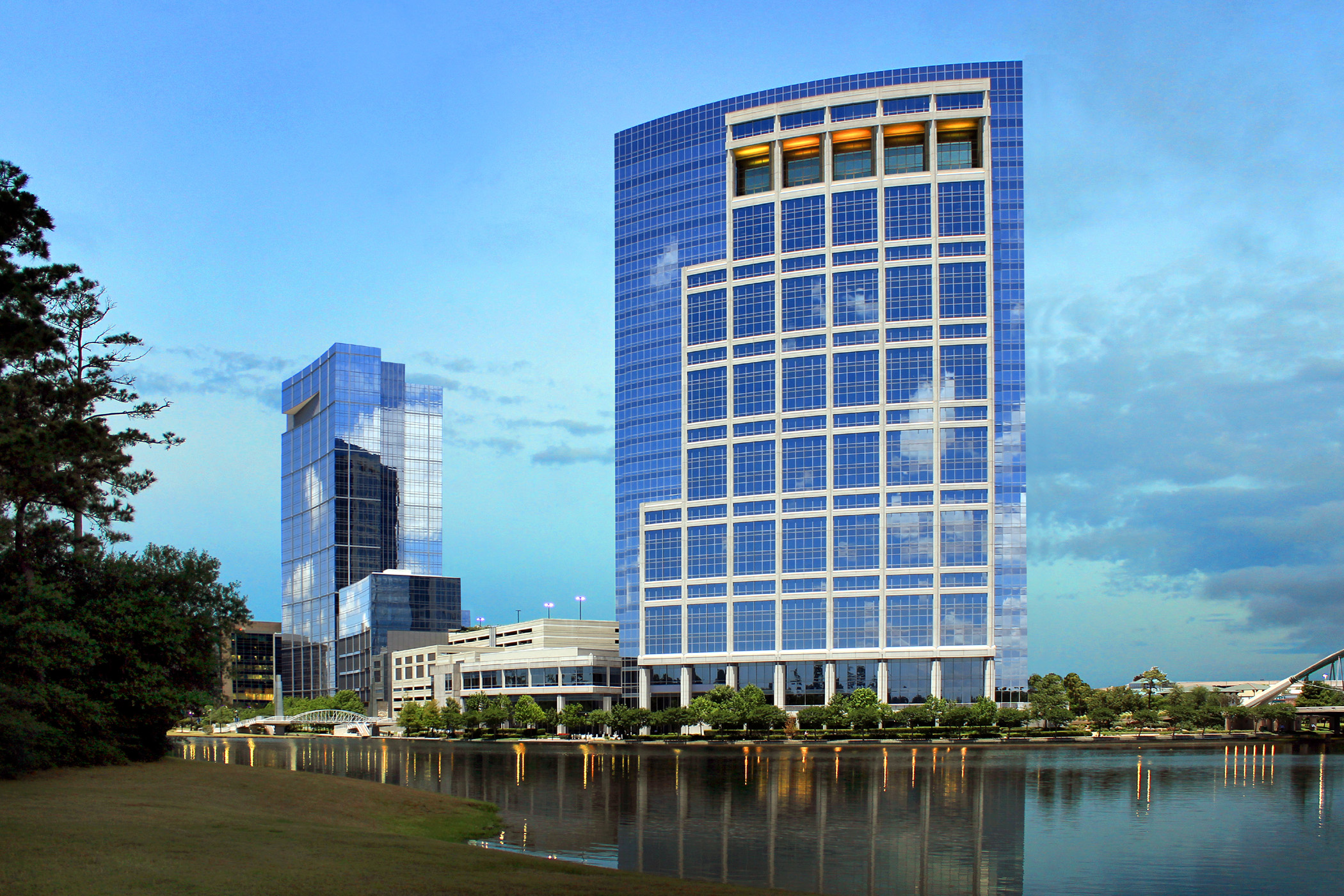
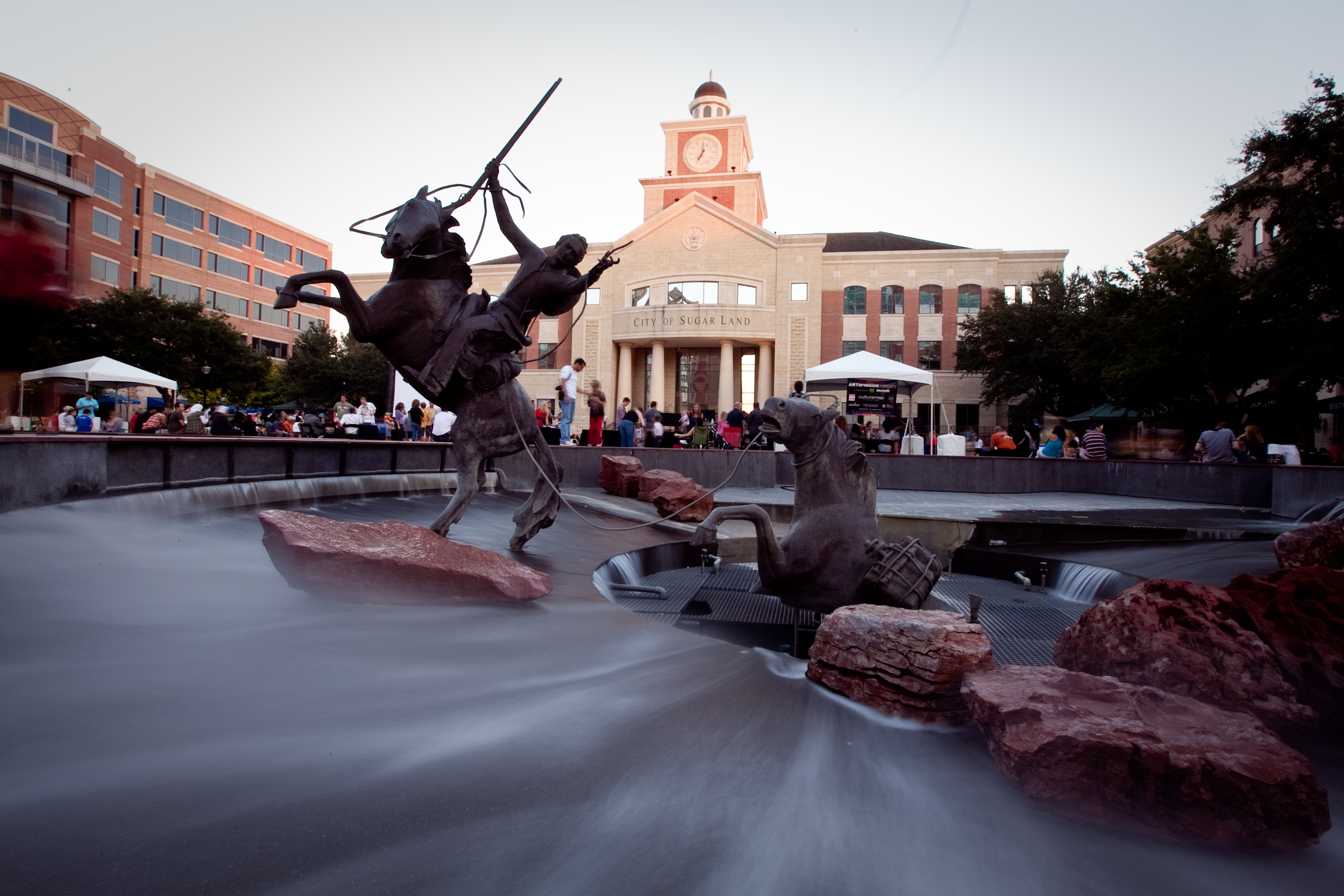
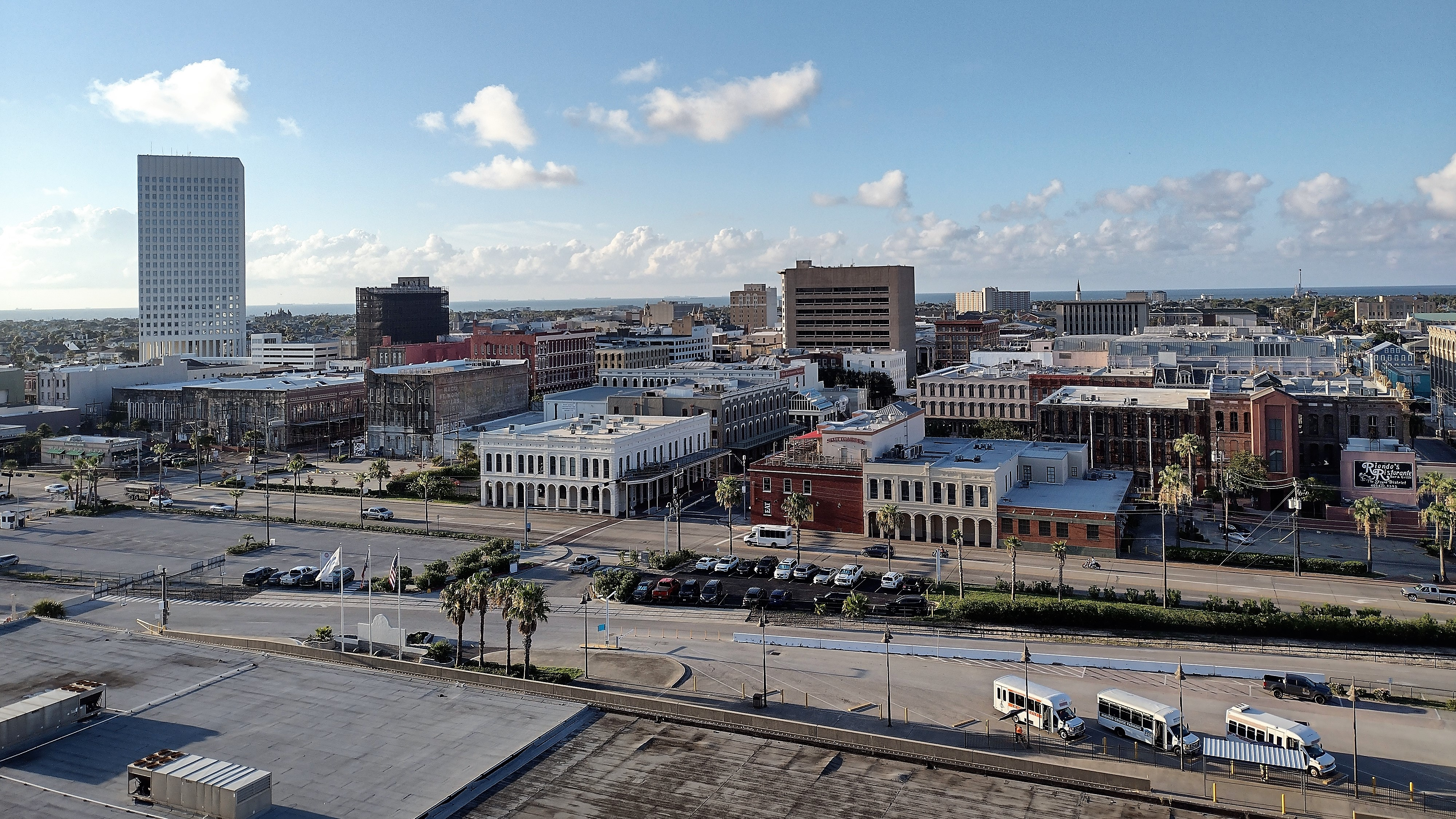
- From top to bottom, left to right: Houston, The Woodlands, Sugar Land, and Galveston
Interactive Map of Houston–Pasadena, TX CSA
City of Houston
Houston–Pasadena–The Woodlands MSA
Huntsville µSA
El Campo µSA
Bay City µSA
Brenham µSA
- Country: United States
- State: Texas
- Principal cities: List: Houston; Pasadena; The Woodlands; Sugar Land; Conroe; Baytown; Galveston; Texas City

Area
  - Urban: 1,660.0 sq mi (4,299.4 km^{2})
  - Metro: 10,062 sq mi (26,061 km^{2})
- Highest elevation: 430 ft (131 m)
- Lowest elevation: 0 ft (0 m)

Population (2020)
  - Density: 3,000/sq mi (1,150/km^{2})
  - Urban: 5,853,575 (5th)
  - MSA: 7,796,182 (5th)
  - CSA: 7,824,643 (9th)

GDP
  - MSA: $696.999 billion (2023)
- Time zone: UTC-6 (CST)
  - Summer (DST): UTC-5 (CDT)
- Area codes: 361, 409, 713/281/832/346, 936, 979

Greater Houston, designated by the United States Office of Management and Budget as Houston–Pasadena–The Woodlands, is the fifth-most populous metropolitan statistical area in the United States, encompassing ten counties along the Gulf Coast in Southeast Texas. As of 2025, it has a population of about 7,900,000.

The region of approximately 10,000 square miles (26,000 square kilometers) centers on Harris County, the third-most populous county in the U.S., which contains the city of Houston, with a population of more than 2.3 million as of 2010. Greater Houston is part of the Texas Triangle megaregion along with the Dallas–Fort Worth metroplex, Greater Austin, and Greater San Antonio. Greater Houston also serves as a major anchor and economic hub for the Gulf Coast. Its Port of Houston is the largest port in the United States and the 16th-largest in the world.

Greater Houston has historically been among the fastest-growing metropolitan areas in the United States.

Greater Houston has the seventh-highest metropolitan-area gross domestic product in the United States, valued at $551 billion in 2023. A major trade center anchored by the Port of Houston, the region has the highest trade export value of all metropolitan areas, at over $180 billion in 2024, accounting for 9% of all U.S. exports. As of 2024, Greater Houston is home to the headquarters of 24 Fortune 500 companies, ranking third among all metropolitan statistical areas. The Greater Houston metropolitan area was ranked the fourth-most diverse metropolitan area in the United States in 2012.

== Geography ==
Satellite picture of Greater Houston

According to the City of Houston, the Houston–Pasadena–The Woodlands metropolitan statistical area has a total area of 10,062 square miles (26,060 km^{2}), which is slightly smaller than the U.S. state of Maryland. The U.S. Office of Management and Budget combines the Houston–Pasadena–The Woodlands metropolis with four micropolitan statistical areas (Bay City, Brenham, El Campo, and Huntsville) to form the Houston–Pasadena, TX combined statistical area.

The metropolitan area is located in the Gulf Coastal Plains biome, and its vegetation is classified as temperate grassland. Much of the urbanized area was built on forested land, marshes, swamp, or prairie, remnants of which can still be seen in surrounding areas. Of particular note is the Katy Prairie to the west, the Big Thicket to the northeast, and the Galveston Bay ecosystem to the south. Additionally, the metropolitan region is crossed by a number of creeks and bayous, which provide essential drainage during rainfall events; some of the most notable waterways include Buffalo Bayou (upon which Houston was founded), White Oak Bayou, Brays Bayou, Spring Creek, and the San Jacinto River. The upper drainage basin of Buffalo Bayou is impounded by two large flood control reservoirs, Barker Reservoir and Addicks Reservoir, which provide a combined 400,000 acre-feet (490 million cubic meters) of storage during large rainfall events and cover a total land area of 26,100 acres (106 km^{2}). Greater Houston's extremely flat topography, susceptibility to high-intensity rainfall events, high level of impervious surface, and inadequately-sized natural drainage channels make it particularly susceptible to catastrophic flooding events.

=== Geology ===
Underpinning Greater Houston's land surface are unconsolidated clays, clay shales, and poorly cemented sands up to several miles deep. The region's geology developed from stream deposits formed from the erosion of the Rocky Mountains. These sediments consist of a series of sands and clays deposited on decaying organic matter that, over time, transformed into oil and natural gas. Beneath these tiers is a water-deposited layer of halite, a rock salt. The porous layers were compressed over time and forced upward. As it pushed upward, the salt dragged surrounding sediments into dome shapes, often trapping oil and gas that seeped from the surrounding porous sands. This thick, rich soil also provides a good environment for rice farming in suburban outskirts into which the city of Houston continues to grow near Katy. Evidence of past rice farming is even still evident in developed areas as an abundance of rich, dark, loamy topsoil exists.

The Greater Houston region is generally earthquake-free. While the city of Houston contains over 150 to 300 active surface faults with an aggregate length of up to 310 miles (500 km), the clay below the surface precludes the buildup of friction that produces ground-shaking in earthquakes. These faults generally move at a smooth rate in what is termed "fault creep".

=== Climate ===
Greater Houston has a humid subtropical climate typical of the Southern United States. It is rainy most of the year. Prevailing winds come from the south and southeast during most of the year, which bring heat and moisture from the nearby Gulf of Mexico and Galveston Bay area.

==== List of hurricanes ====
A number of tropical storms and hurricanes have hit the metropolitan area, including:

- 1900 Galveston Hurricane, which devastated Galveston and was the deadliest natural disaster in United States history, killing between 8,000 and 12,000.
- Hurricane Carla (1961), which was the most recent Category 4 hurricane to strike Texas until Harvey in 2017.
- Hurricane Alicia (1983), which struck the area as a Category 3, and was at the time, the costliest Atlantic hurricane.
- Tropical Storm Allison (2001), until Harvey, which brought the worst flooding in Houston history and was the first tropical storm to be retired.
- Hurricane Rita (2005), which triggered one of the largest evacuations in United States history in the wake of Hurricane Katrina.
- Hurricane Ike (2008), which brought devastating storm surge to the coast and wind damage into the city.
- Hurricane Harvey (2017), which brought devastating flooding that resulted in excess of $100 billion in damages to Southeast Texas.
- Tropical Storm Imelda (2019) caused widespread flooding around Houston and surrounding areas.
- Hurricane Nicholas (2021), did moderate damage, and brought wind and rain to the area.
- Hurricane Beryl (2024), brought strong winds and significant rainfall, causing devastating damage in Houston.

Climate data for Houston Heights (1991-2020)
Month	Jan	Feb	Mar	Apr	May	Jun	Jul	Aug	Sep	Oct	Nov	Dec	Year
Average precipitation inches	4.60	3.33	4.92	4.48	6.20	6.15	4.92	5.87	5.51	5.08	4.98	4.45	60.49
Average precipitation mm	117	85	125	114	157	156	125	149	140	129	126	113	1,536
Source: https://www.ncei.noaa.gov/access/us-climate-normals/#dataset=normals-annualseasonal&timeframe=30&station=USC00414321

Climate data for Houston (Intercontinental Airport), 1991–2020 normals, (Note: Mean monthly maxima and minima (i.e. the highest and lowest temperature readings during an entire month or year) calculated based on data at said location from 1991 to 2020.) extremes 1888–present (Note: Official records for Houston were kept at the Weather Bureau in downtown from July 1888 to May 1969, and at Intercontinental since June 1969.)
Month	Jan	Feb	Mar	Apr	May	Jun	Jul	Aug	Sep	Oct	Nov	Dec	Year
Record high °F (°C)	85 (29)	91 (33)	96 (36)	95 (35)	99 (37)	107 (42)	105 (41)	109 (43)	109 (43)	99 (37)	89 (32)	85 (29)	109 (43)
Mean maximum °F (°C)	78.9 (26.1)	81.2 (27.3)	85.4 (29.7)	88.6 (31.4)	93.8 (34.3)	97.8 (36.6)	99.1 (37.3)	101.2 (38.4)	97.3 (36.3)	92.2 (33.4)	84.9 (29.4)	80.7 (27.1)	102.1 (38.9)
Mean daily maximum °F (°C)	63.8 (17.7)	67.8 (19.9)	74.0 (23.3)	80.1 (26.7)	86.9 (30.5)	92.3 (33.5)	94.5 (34.7)	94.9 (34.9)	90.4 (32.4)	82.8 (28.2)	72.6 (22.6)	65.3 (18.5)	80.5 (26.9)
Daily mean °F (°C)	53.8 (12.1)	57.7 (14.3)	63.8 (17.7)	70.0 (21.1)	77.4 (25.2)	83.0 (28.3)	85.1 (29.5)	85.2 (29.6)	80.5 (26.9)	71.8 (22.1)	62.0 (16.7)	55.4 (13.0)	70.5 (21.4)
Mean daily minimum °F (°C)	43.7 (6.5)	47.6 (8.7)	53.6 (12.0)	59.8 (15.4)	67.8 (19.9)	73.7 (23.2)	75.7 (24.3)	75.4 (24.1)	70.6 (21.4)	60.9 (16.1)	51.5 (10.8)	45.6 (7.6)	60.5 (15.8)
Mean minimum °F (°C)	27.5 (−2.5)	31.6 (−0.2)	35.0 (1.7)	43.4 (6.3)	53.8 (12.1)	66.5 (19.2)	70.5 (21.4)	70.0 (21.1)	58.3 (14.6)	44.1 (6.7)	34.2 (1.2)	30.0 (−1.1)	26.0 (−3.3)
Record low °F (°C)	5 (−15)	6 (−14)	21 (−6)	31 (−1)	42 (6)	52 (11)	62 (17)	54 (12)	45 (7)	29 (−2)	19 (−7)	7 (−14)	5 (−15)
Average precipitation inches (mm)	3.76 (96)	2.97 (75)	3.47 (88)	3.95 (100)	5.01 (127)	6.00 (152)	3.77 (96)	4.84 (123)	4.71 (120)	5.46 (139)	3.87 (98)	4.03 (102)	51.84 (1,317)
Average snowfall inches (cm)	0.0 (0.0)	0.0 (0.0)	0.0 (0.0)	0.0 (0.0)	0.0 (0.0)	0.0 (0.0)	0.0 (0.0)	0.0 (0.0)	0.0 (0.0)	0.0 (0.0)	0.0 (0.0)	0.1 (0.25)	0.1 (0.25)
Average precipitation days (≥ 0.01 in)	10.0	8.8	8.8	7.3	8.6	10.0	9.1	8.5	8.4	7.7	7.6	9.6	104.4
Average snowy days (≥ 0.1 in)	0.0	0.0	0.0	0.0	0.0	0.0	0.0	0.0	0.0	0.0	0.0	0.1	0.1
Average relative humidity (%)	74.7	73.4	72.7	73.1	75.0	74.6	74.4	75.1	76.8	75.4	76.0	75.5	74.7
Average dew point °F (°C)	41.5 (5.3)	44.2 (6.8)	51.3 (10.7)	57.7 (14.3)	65.1 (18.4)	70.3 (21.3)	72.1 (22.3)	72.0 (22.2)	68.5 (20.3)	59.5 (15.3)	51.4 (10.8)	44.8 (7.1)	58.2 (14.6)
Mean monthly sunshine hours	143.4	155.0	192.5	209.8	249.2	281.3	293.9	270.5	236.5	228.8	168.3	148.7	2,577.9
Percentage possible sunshine	44	50	52	54	59	67	68	66	64	64	53	47	58
Average ultraviolet index	3.5	5.0	7.1	8.6	9.6	10.3	9.9	9.5	8.1	5.9	4.0	3.2	7.0
Source 1: NOAA (relative humidity and dew point 1969–1990, sun 1961–1990)
Source 2: UV Index Today (1995 to 2022)

Climate data for Houston (William P. Hobby Airport), 1981–2010 normals, extremes 1941–present
Month	Jan	Feb	Mar	Apr	May	Jun	Jul	Aug	Sep	Oct	Nov	Dec	Year
Record high °F (°C)	85 (29)	87 (31)	96 (36)	94 (34)	100 (38)	105 (41)	104 (40)	106 (41)	108 (42)	96 (36)	90 (32)	84 (29)	108 (42)
Mean daily maximum °F (°C)	63.0 (17.2)	66.0 (18.9)	72.4 (22.4)	78.8 (26.0)	85.4 (29.7)	90.1 (32.3)	92.1 (33.4)	92.6 (33.7)	88.4 (31.3)	81.2 (27.3)	72.4 (22.4)	64.5 (18.1)	78.9 (26.1)
Mean daily minimum °F (°C)	45.1 (7.3)	48.5 (9.2)	54.3 (12.4)	60.9 (16.1)	68.7 (20.4)	73.9 (23.3)	75.5 (24.2)	75.7 (24.3)	71.7 (22.1)	63.1 (17.3)	53.9 (12.2)	46.7 (8.2)	61.5 (16.4)
Record low °F (°C)	10 (−12)	14 (−10)	22 (−6)	36 (2)	44 (7)	56 (13)	64 (18)	66 (19)	50 (10)	33 (1)	25 (−4)	9 (−13)	9 (−13)
Average precipitation inches (mm)	3.87 (98)	3.21 (82)	3.20 (81)	3.25 (83)	4.75 (121)	7.10 (180)	4.66 (118)	5.06 (129)	5.21 (132)	5.99 (152)	4.32 (110)	4.03 (102)	54.65 (1,388)
Average precipitation days (≥ 0.01 in)	9.2	9.0	8.0	7.1	7.3	9.9	9.1	9.8	9.1	7.6	8.5	9.1	103.7
Source: NOAA

== Metropolitan communities ==
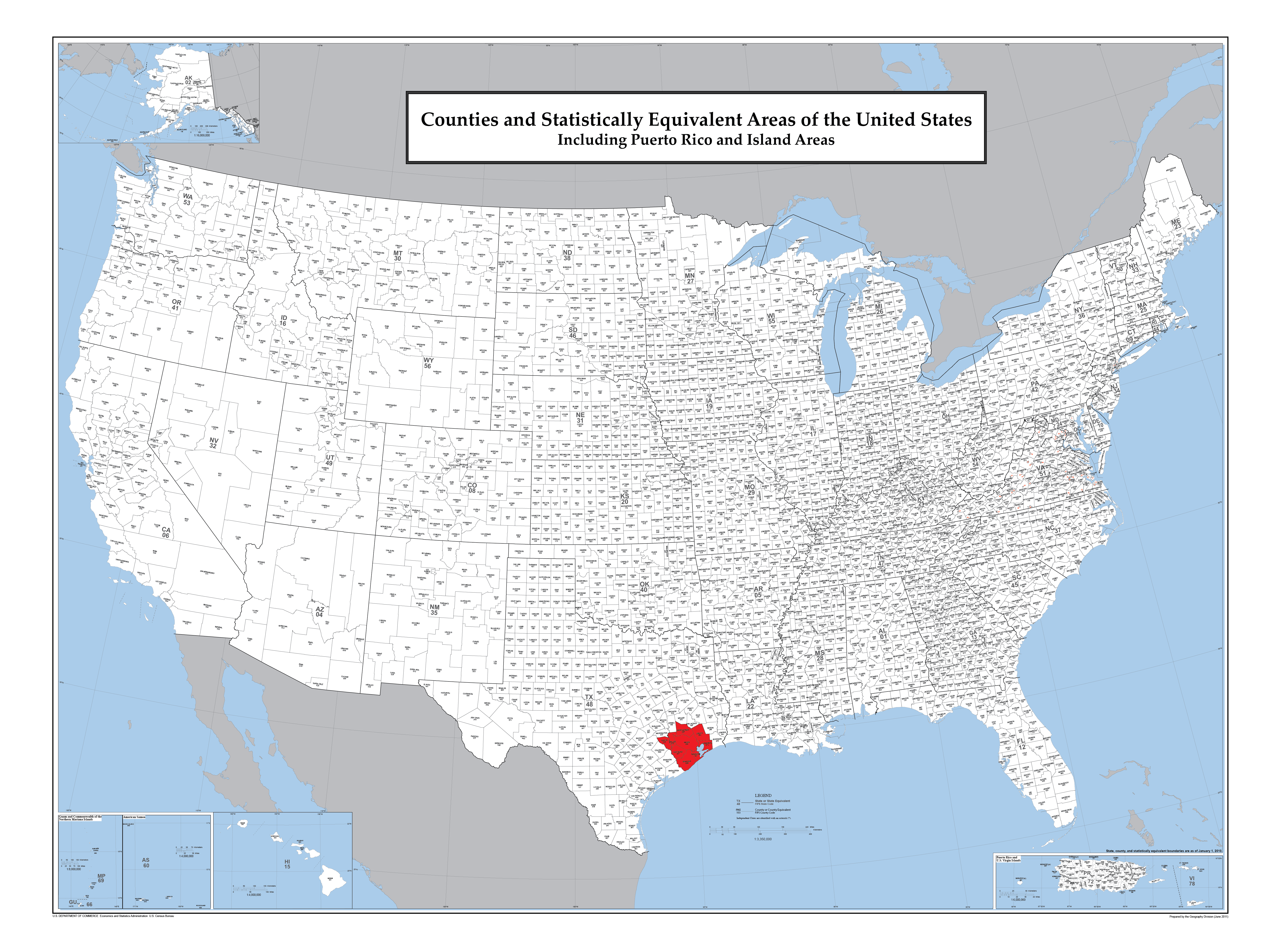
Location in the U.S. (red)

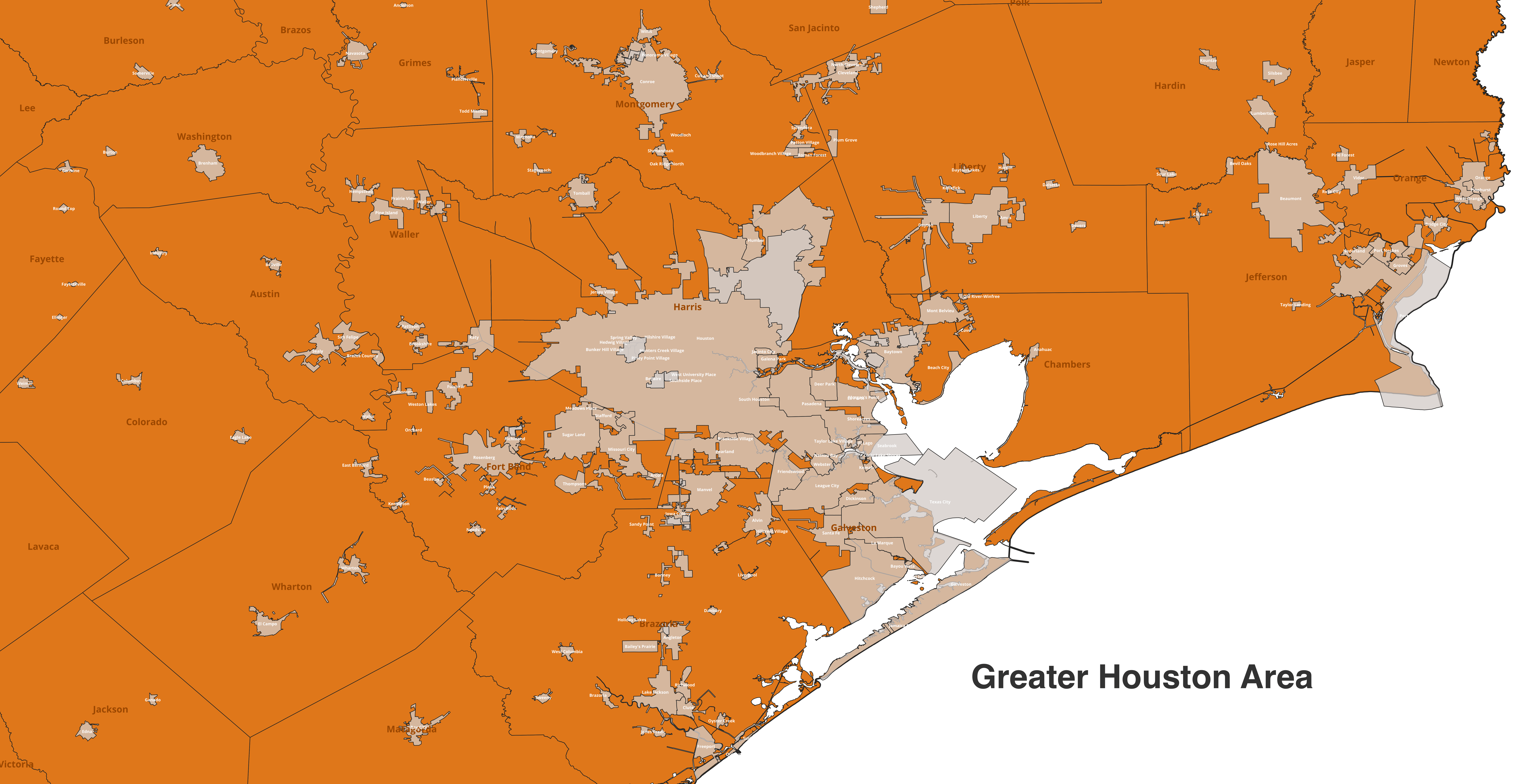
Greater Houston area

=== Counties ===
As defined by the U.S. Office of Management and Budget, the metropolitan area of Houston–Pasadena–The Woodlands encompasses ten counties in Southeast Texas. They are listed below:

- Austin County
- Brazoria County
- Chambers County
- Fort Bend County
- Galveston County
- Harris County
- Liberty County
- Montgomery County
- San Jacinto County
- Waller County

=== Communities ===
Eight principal communities are designated within the Greater Houston metropolitan area. The Woodlands is a census-designated place; the rest are cities. They are listed below:

- Houston (2,325,502)
- Pasadena (154,193)
- The Woodlands (116,278)
- Sugar Land (118,600)
- Conroe (98,081)
- Baytown (77,024)
- Galveston (50,457)
- Texas City (55,667)

Other communities:

- Pearland (122,149)
- League City (106,244)
- Katy (26,360)
- Missouri City (76,500)
- Spring (CDP) (62,569)

Other regions within the Greater Houston area:

- Greater Katy approximately (375,000)

== Demographics ==
Historical populations Greater Houston
Census	Pop.	Note	%±
1900	63,786		—
1910	115,693		81.4%
1920	186,667		61.3%
1930	359,328		92.5%
1940	528,961		47.2%
1950	806,701		52.5%
1960	1,243,158		54.1%
1970	1,985,031		59.7%
1980	2,905,353		46.4%
1990	3,301,937		13.7%
2000	4,177,646		26.5%
2010	5,920,416		41.7%
2020	7,122,240		20.3%
2025 (est.)	7,904,627		11.0%
U.S. Decennial Census

Greater Houston has historically been among the fastest-growing metropolitan areas in the United States; it was the fastest-growing in absolute terms during the 2013–2014 census year, adding 156,371 people. The area grew 25.2%, adding over 950,000 people, between 1990 and 2000 in comparison to a 13.2% increase in the national population over the same period. Between 2000 and 2007, the area added over 910,000 people. The Greater Houston Partnership projected the metropolitan area would add between 4.1 and 8.3 million new residents between 2010 and 2050.

County	2025 Estimate	2020 Census	Change	Area	Density
Harris County	5,045,026	4,731,145	+6.63%	1,703.48 sq mi (4,412.0 km^{2})	2,962/sq mi (1,143/km^{2})
Fort Bend County	975,191	822,779	+18.52%	861.48 sq mi (2,231.2 km^{2})	1,132/sq mi (437/km^{2})
Montgomery County	781,194	620,443	+25.91%	1,041.73 sq mi (2,698.1 km^{2})	750/sq mi (290/km^{2})
Brazoria County	419,080	372,031	+12.65%	1,357.70 sq mi (3,516.4 km^{2})	309/sq mi (119/km^{2})
Galveston County	372,207	350,682	+6.14%	378.36 sq mi (979.9 km^{2})	984/sq mi (380/km^{2})
Liberty County	121,364	91,628	+32.45%	1,158.42 sq mi (3,000.3 km^{2})	105/sq mi (40/km^{2})
Waller County	69,858	56,794	+23.00%	513.43 sq mi (1,329.8 km^{2})	136/sq mi (53/km^{2})
Chambers County	57,594	46,571	+23.67%	597.14 sq mi (1,546.6 km^{2})	96/sq mi (37/km^{2})
Austin County	33,625	30,167	+11.46%	646.51 sq mi (1,674.5 km^{2})	52/sq mi (20/km^{2})
San Jacinto County	29,488	27,402	+7.61%	569.24 sq mi (1,474.3 km^{2})	52/sq mi (20/km^{2})
Total	7,904,627	7,149,612	+10.56%	8,258.25 sq mi (21,388.8 km^{2})	895/sq mi (346/km^{2})

Population density in the Houston urban area, 2020

Numerically, Greater Houston is the second fastest growing metropolitan area in the U.S. There were a total of 7,122,240 residents within the Greater Houston metropolitan area as of 2020, according to the United States Census Bureau. In 2010, Greater Houston had 5,920,416 residents and in 2000, it had a population of 4,177,646. Another 2010 estimate determined the population increased to 5,920,487. Of the population an estimated 575,000 were undocumented immigrants according to 2014 estimates.

In 2020, Greater Houston's racial makeup was 41% White (non-Hispanic white 34%), 20% Black and African American, 8% Asian and 3% from two or more races; additionally, 37% of the metropolitan population were Hispanic and Latino Americans of any race. Among its metropolitan population, roughly 23.4% were foreign-born. The largest foreign-born population came from Latin America, followed by Asia, Africa, Europe and other parts of North America. The metropolitan statistical area was classified as one of the largest regions where the three largest minority groups were highly represented. In 2018, its racial makeup had an estimated 35.5% Anglo American, 20% Black and African American, 7.6% Asian American and 2.1% other races; approximately 37.6% were Hispanic or Latino American of any race. Nearly one in four Greater Houstonians were foreign-born in 2018 and a quarter of all refugees settled in Texas lived in the region.

According to the 2019 American Community Survey, the median household income was $69,193 and the per capita income was $35,190. Roughly 13% of the metropolis lived at or below the poverty line. As of 2011, Greater Houston has four of Texas's 10 wealthiest communities, which include the wealthiest community, Hunters Creek Village, the fourth-wealthiest community, Bunker Hill Village, the fifth-wealthiest community, West University Place, and the sixth-wealthiest community, Piney Point Village.

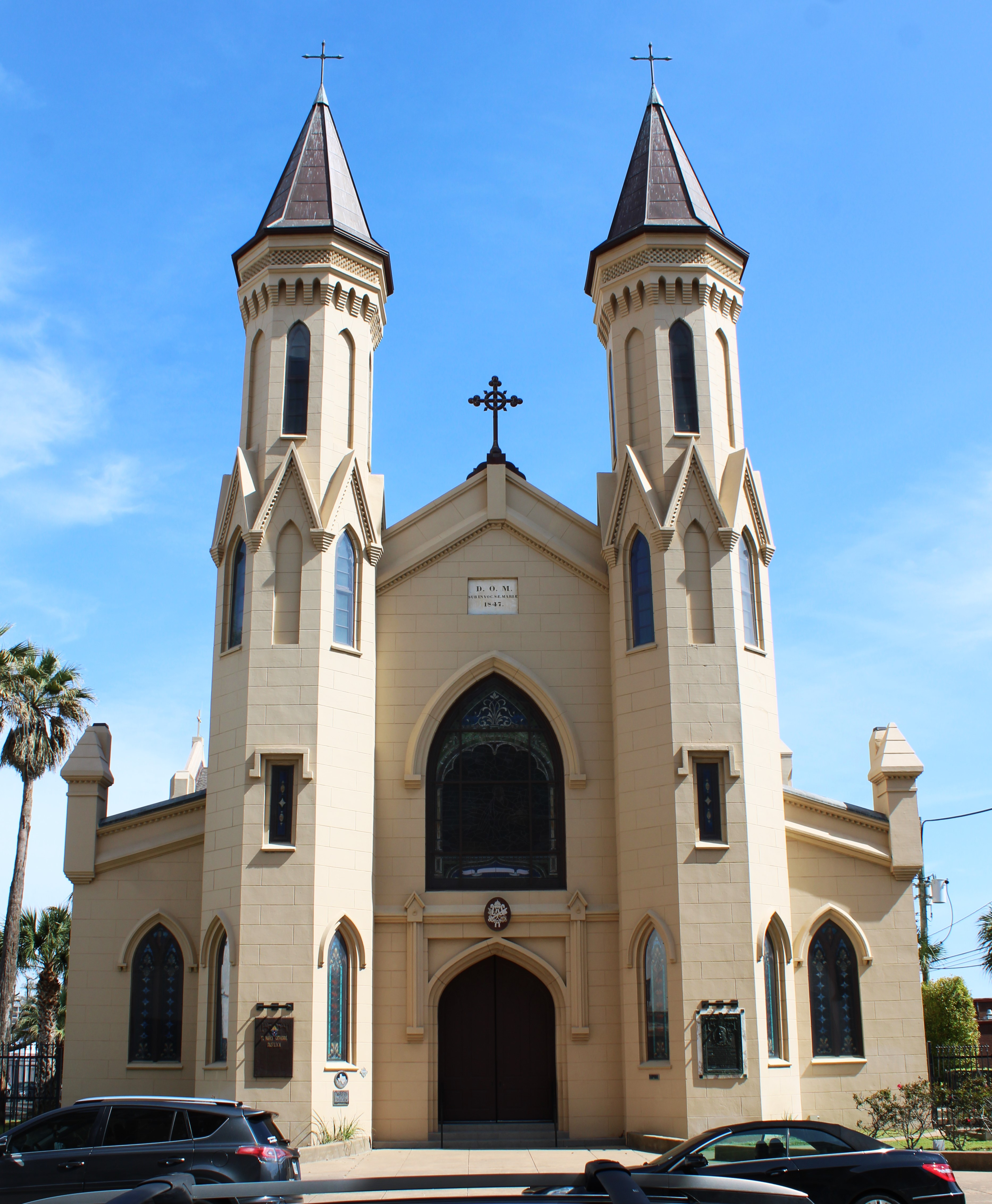
St. Mary's Cathedral (Galveston)

Greater Houston's religious community is predominantly Christian and the second-largest metropolitan area that identifies with the religion in Texas after Dallas–Fort Worth (73%). In 2012, the city of Houston proper ranked the ninth most religious city in the U.S.

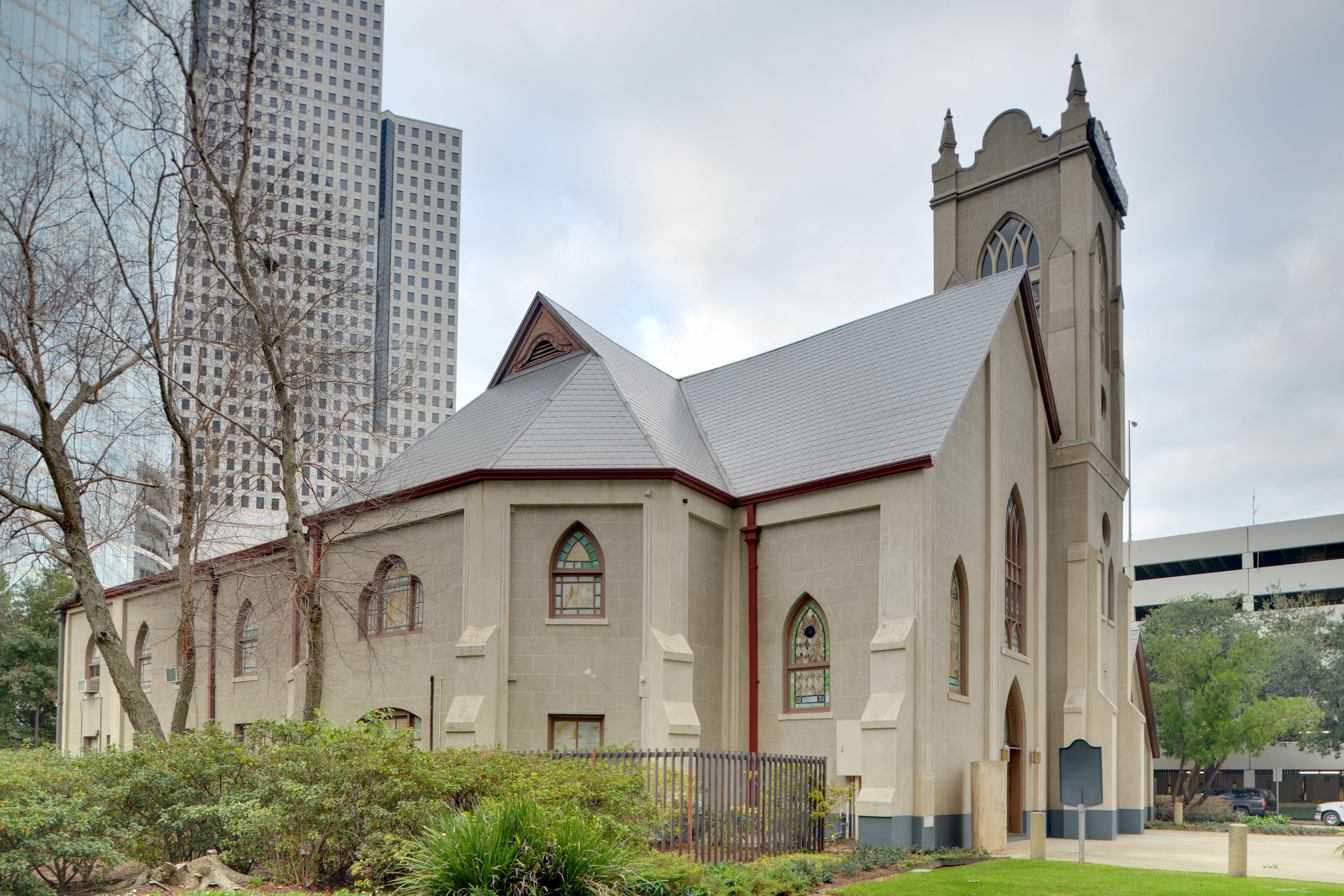
Antioch Missionary Baptist Church (Houston)

Within the Greater Houston metropolitan area, the Catholic Church is the largest single Christian denomination as of a 2014 study by the Pew Research Center. Catholics in Houston are primarily served by the Roman Catholic Archdiocese of Galveston–Houston. Following, the body of Evangelical Protestantism was the second largest according to this study; Baptists dominated the Evangelical Protestant demographic. Mainline Protestantism, led by Methodists, was the third largest Christian group.

In a separate study by the Association of Religion Data Archives in 2020, the Catholic Church numbered 1,299,901 for the metropolitan area; by 2020, the second-largest single Christian denomination (Southern Baptists) numbered 800,688; following, non-denominational Protestant churches represented the third-largest Christian cohort at 666,548.

Altogether, however, Baptists of the Southern Baptist Convention, the American Baptist Association, American Baptist Churches USA, Full Gospel Baptist Church Fellowship, National Baptist Convention USA and National Baptist Convention of America, and the National Missionary Baptist Convention numbered 926,554. Non-denominational Protestants, the Disciples of Christ, Christian Churches and Churches of Christ, and the Churches of Christ numbered 723,603 altogether according to the 2020 study.

Within the Eastern Christian tradition, there were 3,617 Coptic Orthodox Christians, 1,746 Eritrean Orthodox and 850 Ethiopian Orthodox, 6,209 Greek Orthodox, 2,405 Malankara Orthodox Syrians, 641 American Orthodox, and 1,058 Serbian Orthodox in the metropolis.

According to the Pew Research Center's 2014 study, non-Christian religions collectively made up 7% of the religious metropolitan population. The largest non-Christian religion was Judaism. According to the study, 20% of Greater Houston was irreligious and 2% were atheist. The Association of Religion Data Archives 2020 study determined there were 7,061 Conservative Jews and 3,050 Orthodox Jews; there were 11,481 Reform Jews throughout the area. There were an estimated 123,256 Muslims, 51,567 Hindus and Yoga practitioners, and 20,281 Buddhists.

== Economy ==
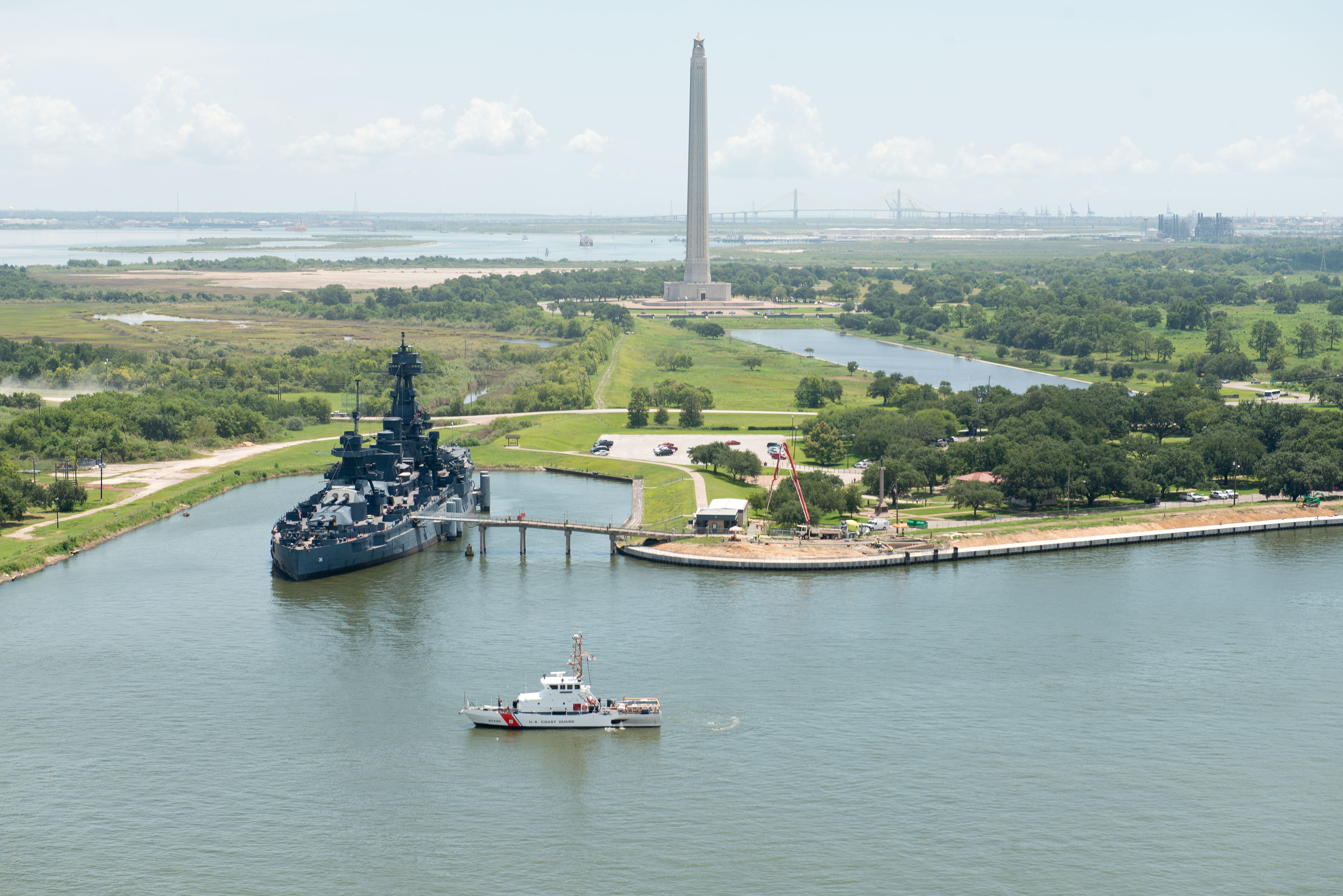
Houston Ship Channel, 2016

Among the 10 most populous metropolitan areas in the U.S., Greater Houston ranked first in employment growth rate and second in nominal employment growth. In 2006, the Greater Houston metropolitan area ranked first in Texas and third in the U.S. within the category of "Best Places for Business and Careers" by Forbes.

The Houston–Pasadena–The Woodlands area's gross metropolitan product (GMP) in 2005 was $308.7 billion, up 5.4% from 2004 in constant dollars—slightly larger than Austria's gross domestic product. By 2012, the GMP had risen to $449 billion, the fourth-largest of any metropolitan area in the United States. Only 26 countries other than the United States had a GDP exceeding Greater Houston's GAP. Mining, which in the area is almost entirely oil and gas exploration and production, accounted for 11% of Greater Houston's GAP—down from 21% as recently as 1985. The reduced role of oil and gas in Houston's GAP reflects the rapid growth of other sectors—such as engineering services, health services, retail, and manufacturing.

The area's economic activity is centered in the city of Houston, the county seat of Harris County. Houston is second to New York City in Fortune 500 headquarters. The city has attempted to build a banking industry, but the companies originally started in Houston have since merged with other companies nationwide. Banking, however, is still vital to the metropolitan region.

Galveston Bay and the Buffalo Bayou together form one of the most important shipping hubs in the world. The Port of Houston, the Port of Texas City, and the Port of Galveston are all major seaports located in this Greater Houston area. The area is also one of the leading centers of the energy industry, particularly petroleum processing, and many companies have large operations in this region. The metropolitan area also comprises the largest petrochemical manufacturing area in the world, including for synthetic rubber, insecticides, and fertilizers. The area is also the world's leading center for building oilfield equipment. Greater Houston is also a major center of biomedical research, aeronautics, and high technology.

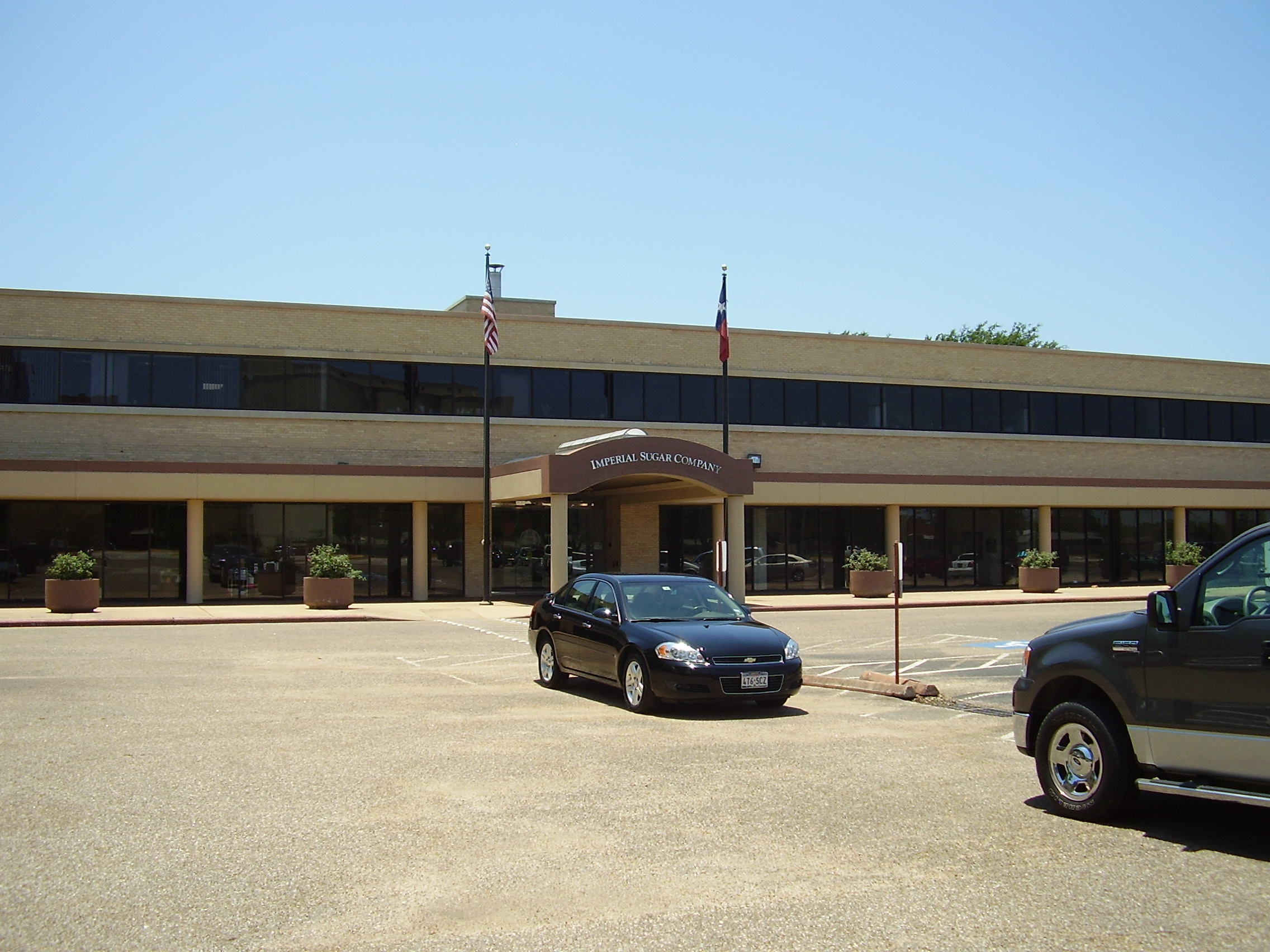
Imperial Sugar offices in Sugar Land, Texas

Much of the metro area's success as a petrochemical complex is enabled by its busy man-made Houston Ship Channel. Because of these economic trades, many residents have moved to the Houston area from other U.S. states, as well as hundreds of countries worldwide. Unlike most places, where high fuel prices are seen as harmful to the economy, they are generally seen as beneficial for Houston, as many are employed in the energy industry. Baytown, Pasadena, La Porte, and Texas City have some of the area's largest petroleum/petrochemical plants, though major operations can be found in Houston, Anahuac, Clute, and other communities. Galveston has the largest cruise-ship terminal in Texas (and the 12th-largest in the world). The island, as well the Clear Lake area, are major recreation and tourism areas in the region.

Houston is home to the Texas Medical Center—the largest medical center in the world. Galveston is home to one of only two national biocontainment laboratories in the United States.

The University of Houston System's annual impact on the Houston-area's economy equates to that of a major corporation: $1.1 billion in new funds attracted annually to the Houston area, $3.13 billion in total economic benefit, and 24,000 local jobs generated. This is in addition to the 12,500 new graduates the UH System produces every year who enter the workforce in Houston and throughout Texas. These degree-holders tend to stay in Houston; after five years, 80.5% of graduates are still living and working in the region.

Sugar Land is home to the second-largest economic activities and fifth-largest city in the metropolitan area. It has the most important economic center in Fort Bend County. The city holds the Imperial Sugar (its namesake), Nalco Champion, and Western Airways headquarters. Engineering firms and other related industries have managed to take the place as an economic engine.

== Sports ==
=== Major professional teams ===
Club	Sport	Founded	League	Venue
Houston Astros	Baseball	1962	MLB	Daikin Park
Houston Rockets	Basketball	1967	NBA	Toyota Center
Houston Texans	Football	2002	NFL	NRG Stadium
Houston Dynamo	Men's soccer	2005	MLS	Shell Energy Stadium
Houston Dash	Women's soccer	2014	NWSL	Shell Energy Stadium
Houston SaberCats	Rugby Union	2018	MLR	Aveva Stadium

=== Minor league and semipro teams ===
Club	Sport	Founded	League	Venue
Houston Energy	Football	2001	WPFL	The Rig
Houston Roughnecks	Football	2018	XFL	TDECU Stadium
Houston Red Storm	Basketball	2006	ABA	John H. Reagan HS
Sugar Land Space Cowboys	Baseball	2022	Pacific Coast League	Constellation Field
Houston Dutch Lions	Soccer	2011	PDL	HDLFC Soccer Complex
Houston Aces	Women's soccer	2012	UWS	Carl Lewis Stadium
Houston Hotshots	Indoor soccer	2015	PASL	TBD
Houston Havoc	Ultimate	2023	UFA	Aveva Stadium

=== College sports (Division I) ===
Greater Houston is home to five NCAA Division I programs, with four located within Houston proper. The University of Houston and Rice University play in Division I-A (FBS). The University of Houston plays in the Big 12 Conference, while Rice belongs to the American Athletic Conference. Both schools were once part of the Southwest Conference. Texas Southern University and Prairie View A&M University, which are members of the Southwestern Athletic Conference, plays in Division I-AA (FCS). Houston Christian University (formerly Houston Baptist University) currently plays in Division I (FCS), mainly in the Southland Conference. Rice and Houston Christian are widely noted for their student-athlete graduation rates, which number at 91% for Rice (tied for highest in the nation according to a 2002 Sports Illustrated issue on best college sports programs) and 80% for HBU.

School	Founded	Nickname	Conference
Prairie View A&M University	1876	Prairie View A&M Panthers	Southwestern Athletic Conference
Rice University	1912	Rice Owls	American Athletic Conference
Texas Southern University	1927	Texas Southern Tigers	Southwestern Athletic Conference
University of Houston	1927	Houston Cougars	Big 12 Conference
Houston Christian University	1960	Houston Christian Huskies	Southland Conference

=== Events ===
Houston is or has been home to various nationally known sporting events. The most notable is the Houston Livestock Show and Rodeo, which is the world's largest livestock exhibition and rodeo event. Other events of importance on greater Houston include the Shell Houston Open (a PGA Tour event), the U.S. Men's Clay Court Championships (ATP tour), the Houston Marathon, and the Texas Bowl college football bowl game. From 1959 to 1987, Houston hosted the Bluebonnet Bowl. Houston has also played host to three Super Bowls (VIII, XXXVIII, LI), the 1968, 1986, and 2004 MLB All-Star Games, the 2022, 2021, 2019, 2017, 2005 World Series, and the 1989, 2006, 2013 NBA All-Star Games. Houston has also played host to various high school and college sporting events, including the Big 12 Championship Game and hosted the 2011 NCAA Men's Final Four, 2010 NCAA Men's Regional Finals, and 2010 MLS All-Star Game. Houston has held two WrestleMania events, WrestleMania X-Seven and WrestleMania XXV, which is considered the biggest pro-wrestling event of the year, seen as the Super Bowl of pro-wrestling. Houston was also considered a candidate for the 2012 and 2016 Olympic Games.

== Higher education ==
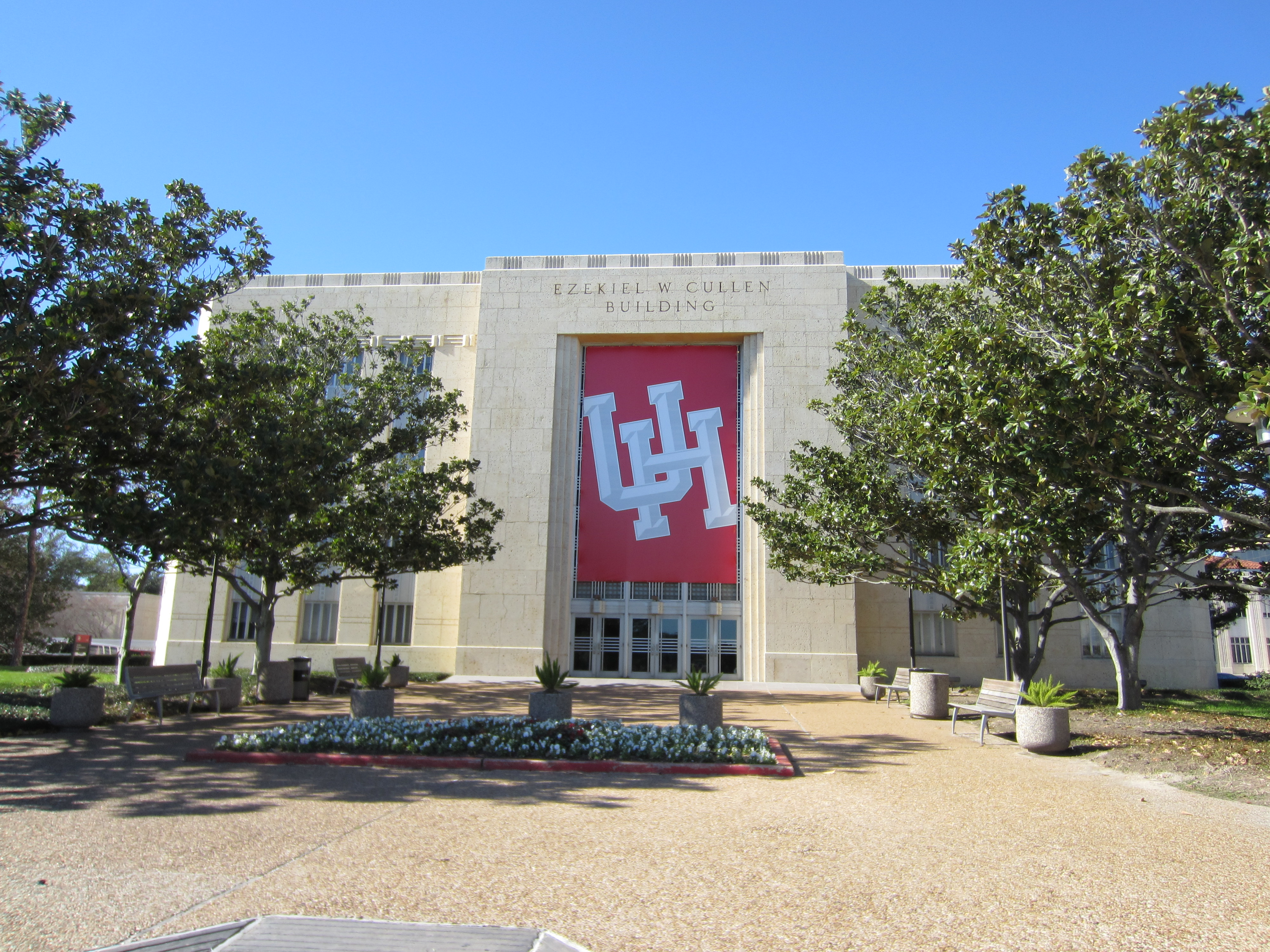
University of Houston

Five separate and distinct state universities are located within the Houston–Pasadena–The Woodlands metropolitan area. The University of Houston is a nationally recognized Tier One research university, and is the flagship institution of the University of Houston System. The third-largest university in Texas, the University of Houston has nearly 43,000 students on its 667-acre campus in southeast Houston. The University of Houston–Clear Lake and the University of Houston–Downtown are standalone universities; they are not branch campuses of the University of Houston. The metropolitan area is home to the two largest historically black institutions in the state: Texas Southern University and Prairie View A&M University. The University of Texas Medical Branch and Texas A&M University at Galveston, a branch campus of Texas A&M University, are located in Galveston.

Several private institutions of higher learning—ranging from liberal arts colleges to a nationally recognized Tier One research university—are located within the metropolitan area. The University of St. Thomas is the only Catholic institution of higher education in Houston. Houston Christian University, located in the Sharpstown area, was founded in 1960. Rice University is one of the leading teaching and research universities of the United States and consistently ranks among the nation's top 20 universities by U.S. News & World Report.

Three community college districts exist with campuses in and around Houston. The Houston Community College System serves most of Houston. The northwestern through northeastern parts of the metropolitan area are served by various campuses of the Lone Star College System, while the southeastern portion of the city and some surrounding areas are served by San Jacinto College.

Eastern portions of the area and small sections of the city are served by Lee College. Portions of Fort Bend County are served by Wharton County Junior College. Portions of Galveston County are served by College of the Mainland and Galveston College. Portions of Brazoria County are served by Alvin Community College and Brazosport College. Blinn College serves portions of Austin County. The Houston Community College and Lone Star College systems are within the 10 largest institutions of higher learning in the United States.

== Politics ==
Politically, the Greater Houston area has historically been divided between areas of strength of the Republican and Democratic parties.

Democrats are also stronger in the more liberal Neartown area, which is home to a large artist and LGBT community, and Alief, which houses a sizable Asian American population. In 2008, almost every county in the region voted for Republican John McCain; only Harris County was won by Democratic candidate Barack Obama, by a small margin (51%–49%). Galveston has long been a staunch Democratic stronghold, with the most active Democratic county establishment in the state.

=== United States Congress ===
Senators	Name	Party	First elected	Level
Senate Class 1	Ted Cruz	Republican	2012	Junior Senator
Senate Class 2	John Cornyn	Republican	2002	Senior Senator
Representatives	Name	Party	First elected	Area(s) of Greater Houston represented
District 2	Dan Crenshaw	Republican	2018	Kingwood portion of Houston, Spring, northeast Harris County (including Baytown, Humble and La Porte), western and southern Liberty County
District 7	Lizzie Pannill Fletcher	Democratic	2018	West Houston, Memorial Villages, Bellaire, West University Place, west and northwest Harris County
District 8	Morgan Luttrell	Republican	2022	Polk and San Jacinto counties; northern Montgomery County; southern Walker County; western Harris County
District 9	Al Green	Democratic	2004	Alief, Southwest Houston, Houston's Southside, portions of Fort Bend County (Mission Bend, eastern portion of Stafford, northern and eastern portions of Missouri City, county's entire share of Houston)
District 10	Michael McCaul	Republican	2004	Northwest Harris County; Austin and Waller counties; most of the Greater Katy area
District 18	Vacant	N/A	N/A	Downtown Houston, Bush IAH, northwest and northeast Houston, inner portions of Houston's Southside
District 22	Troy Nehls	Republican	2020	most of Fort Bend County (Sugar Land, Rosenberg, the southern portion of Greater Katy, plus western and southern portions of Missouri City), northern Brazoria County (including Pearland), portions of Galveston County (La Marque), southern and central Pasadena, Deer Park, parts of Clear Lake City
District 29	Sylvia Garcia	Democratic	2018	East Houston, northern Pasadena, Galena Park, Channelview (all Harris County)
District 36	Brian Babin	Republican	2014	Southeastern and eastern parts of Harris County (including the Lyndon B. Johnson Space Center)

=== Texas Legislature ===
==== Texas Senate ====
District	Name	Party	First elected	Area(s) of Greater Houston represented
3	Robert Nichols	Republican	2006	Liberty County
4	Brandon Creighton	Republican	2014	Southern Montgomery County (including The Woodlands), Kingwood, Liberty County, Chambers County, far eastern portions of Baytown
5	Charles Schwertner	Republican	2012	San Jacinto County
6	Carol Alvarado	Democratic	2018	Houston Ship Channel, eastern portions of Houston, Jacinto City, Galena Park, northern Pasadena, western portion of Baytown
7	Paul Bettencourt	Republican	2015	Memorial Villages, Memorial/Spring Branch area, Addicks Reservoir, Northwest Harris County
11	Larry Taylor	Republican	2013	Northern and central Brazoria County, southeastern portions of Houston and Harris County, the Galveston County mainland, and all areas roughly north of SH 87 on Galveston Island.
13	Borris Miles	Democratic	2017	Downtown Houston, Texas Medical Center, southwest and northeast Houston, Houston's Southside, northern portions of Missouri City, Stafford
15	Molly Cook	Democratic	2024	Northwest Houston, Bush IAH, southern portion of Humble, eastern Harris County
17	Joan Huffman	Republican	2008	Meyerland, Bellaire, West University Place, much of Katy area, far west Houston, Barker Reservoir, portions of Fort Bend County (Sugar Land and southern Missouri City) southern Brazoria County, the area of Galveston Island south of SH 87, entire Bolivar Peninsula, and Port Arthur.
18	Lois Kolkhorst	Republican	2015	Austin, and most of Waller; western Fort Bend County, western Harris County

==== Texas House of Representatives ====
District		Name	Party	First elected	Area(s) of Greater Houston represented
	3	Cecil Bell Jr.	Republican	2012	Part of Montgomery County
	15	Steve Toth	Republican	2018	Part of Montgomery County
	16	Will Metcalf	Republican	2014	Part of Montgomery County
	18	Janis Holt	Republican	2024	San Jacinto and Liberty Counties
	23	Terri Leo-Wilson	Republican	2022	Galveston, Texas City, Bolivar Peninsula, Chambers County
	24	Greg Bonnen	Republican	2012	Portions of Galveston County
	25	Cody Vasut	Republican	2020	Western Brazoria County
	26	Matt Morgan	Republican	2024	Sugar Land
	27	Ron Reynold	Democratic	2010	Missouri City, Fresno, Sienna, Arcola, parts of Stafford, Pearland, and Houston
	28	Gary Gates	Republican	2020	Sugar Land, Fulshear, Weston Lakes, Rosenberg
	29	Jeffrey Barry	Republican	2024	Eastern Brazoria County
	76	Suleman Lalani	Democratic	2022	Northern Portions of Fort Bend County
	85	Stan Kitzman	Republican	2022	Austin, Waller, and Wharton Counties, portions of Fort Bend County
	126	Sam Harless	Republican	2018	Champions/FM 1960
	127	Charles Cunningham	Republican	2022	Kingwood, Lake Houston, Crosby, Wallisville
	128	Briscoe Cain	Republican	2016	East Harris County (Baytown, Deer Park, La Porte)
	129	Dennis Paul	Republican	2014	Southeast Harris County (Clear Lake City Area, NASA Johnson Space Center)
	130	Tom Oliverson	Republican	2016	Northwest Harris County (including Tomball and Cypress-Fairbanks areas)
	131	Alma Allen	Democratic	2004	Outer portions of Houston's Southside
	132	Mike Schofield	Republican	2014	West Harris County (including county's share of Katy and unincorporated western parts of the Katy area)
	133	Mano DeAyala	Republican	2022	West Houston, western portion of Memorial/Spring Branch, part of the Energy Corridor
	134	Ann Johnson	Democratic	2020	Inner western portions of Houston (including Meyerland, River Oaks and Memorial Park), Texas Medical Center, West University Place, Bellaire, Southside Place
	135	Jon Rosenthal	Democratic	2018	Parts of northwest Harris County (including Jersey Village) and southeastern segments of the Champions/FM 1960 area
	137	Gene Wu	Democratic	2012	Southwest Houston (including Sharpstown, Westwood and Fondren Southwest)
	138	Lacey Hull	Republican	2020	Northwest Houston and parts of the Memorial/Spring Branch area north of I-10, Addicks Reservoir
	139	Charlene Ward Johnson	Democratic	2024	North Houston and Aldine west of I-45
	140	Armando Walle	Democratic	2008	North Houston and Aldine east of I-45
	141	Senfronia Thompson	Democratic	1972	Northeast Houston, Bush IAH, Greenspoint, southern portion of Humble
	142	Harold Dutton Jr.	Democratic	1984	Northeast Houston
	143	Ana Hernandez	Democratic	2005	East Houston within Loop 610, Houston Ship Channel, Galena Park, Jacinto City, northern Pasadena
;	144	Mary Ann Perez	Democratic	2017	Southern Pasadena, far southeast Houston
	145	Christina Morales	Democratic	2018	Inner southeastern portions of Houston (mainly east of I-45), South Houston (not part of the city of Houston)
	146	Lauren Ashley Simmons	Democratic	2024	Inner portions of Houston's Southside
	147	Jolanda Jones	Democratic	2022	Downtown Houston, inner southeastern portions of Houston (mainly west of I-45)
	148	Penny Morales Shaw	Democratic	2020	Northwest Houston mainly within Loop 610 (including Houston Heights)
	149	Hubert Vo	Democratic	2004	Far west Houston, Alief, unincorporated portions of Katy area east of Fry Rd, Barker Reservoir
	150	Valoree Swanson	Republican	2016	Northern Harris County (Spring, Klein, northern Humble)

Presidential election results
Year	DEM	GOP	Others
2024	45.1% 1,305,209	53.4% 1,544,755	1.4% 41,837
2020	49.8% 1,330,116	48.8% 1,302,436	1.4% 36,931
2016	47.4% 991,171	48.4% 1,012,507	4.3% 89,327
2012	43.6% 811,798	55.2% 1,027,708	1.3% 23,530
2008	45.6% 823,491	53.6% 967,233	0.7% 13,508
2004	41.0% 664,498	58.4% 947,144	0.7% 10,635
2000	40.0% 571,677	57.4% 818,742	2.6% 37,095
1996	43.2% 524,035	50.6% 614,174	6.2% 75,696
1992	36.9% 485,614	43.1% 566,917	19.9% 261,767
1988	41.9% 464,661	57.2% 633,685	0.9% 10,405
1984	37.5% 435,551	62.2% 721,871	0.3% 3,141
1980	38.5% 361,817	57.6% 541,762	3.9% 37,116
1976	48.1% 421,617	51.0% 446,420	0.9% 7,603
1972	36.6% 265,828	62.9% 457,043	0.5% 3,466
1968	39.4% 236,209	40.8% 244,601	19.8% 118,699
1964	61.1% 297,393	38.7% 188,335	0.2% 1,099
1960	47.5% 198,877	50.1% 209,747	2.4% 10,122

== Culture ==
Houston's concentration of consular offices ranks third in the nation and first in the South, with 90 countries represented. The city of Houston is considered a major center of Black and African American political power, education, economic prosperity, and culture, often called the new black mecca after Atlanta, Georgia. Houston and its metropolitan area also has a sizable Hispanic and Latin American community. CNN/Money and Money magazine have recognized cities in the Greater Houston area the past three years as part of its "100 Best Places to Live in the United States". In 2005, Sugar Land, southwest of Houston in northeast Fort Bend County, was ranked 46th in the nation, and one of only three Texas cities among the Top 100. In 2006, the magazine recognized Sugar Land again, this time as the third-best city on its list. Also making the 2006 list were League City (65th) in northern Galveston County and The Woodlands (73rd) in southern Montgomery County. In 2007, another Houston suburb, Friendswood, made the list ranked 51st in the nation. The 2006 list only includes cities with at least 50,000 residents, and the 2007 list contains only cities with less than 50,000 residents.

Greater Houston is widely noted for its ethnic diversity and strong international community. In its 2010 publication "Urban Elite", A.T. Kearney added the city to their list of the 65 most important world cities and ranks Houston 35th, as "...a magnet for a diverse population and business services...". The Globalization and World Cities Study Group and Network ranks Houston as a Alpha- World City, "an important world city instrumental to linking their region or state to the world economy."

=== Media ===
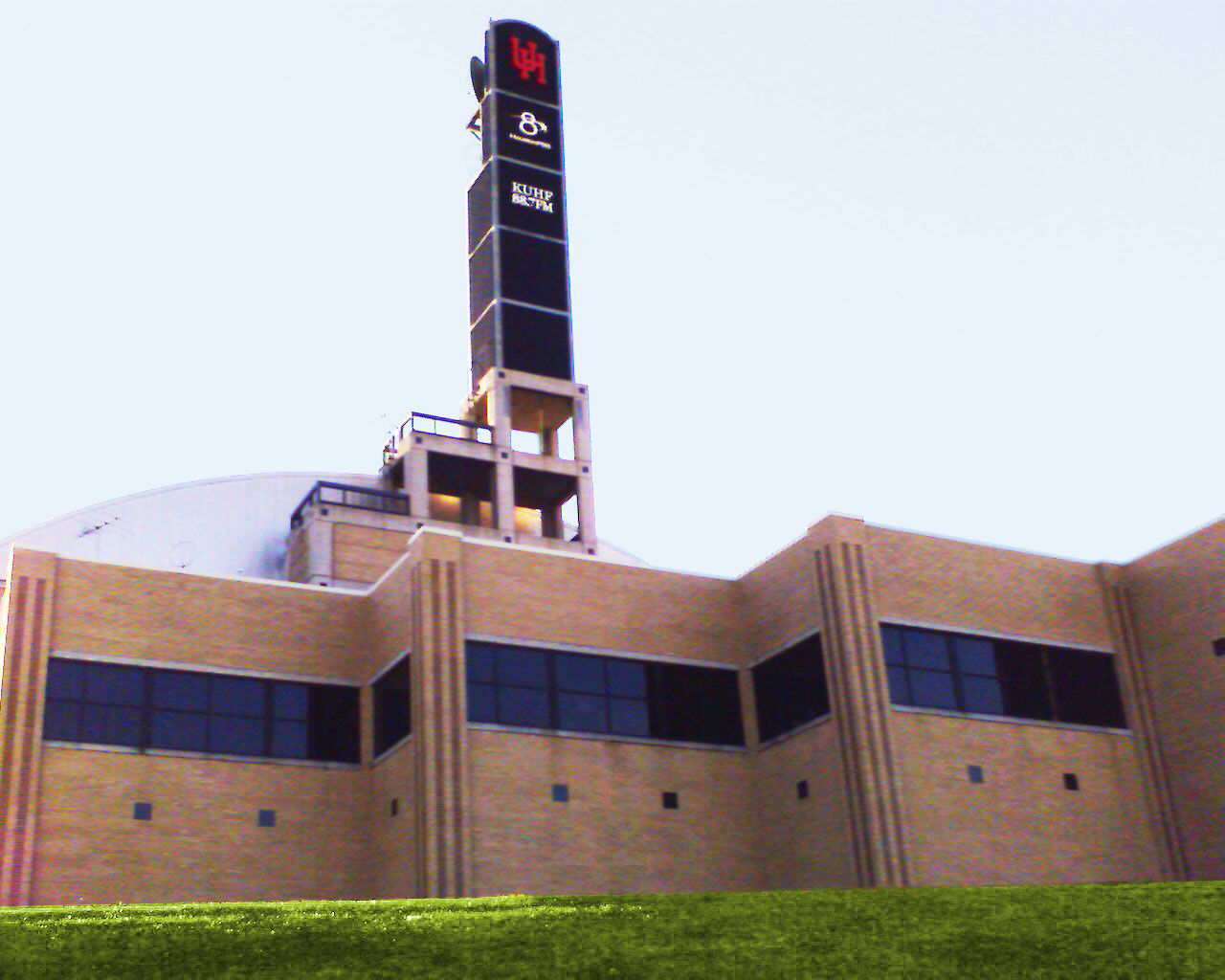
Melcher Center for Public Broadcasting at the University of Houston

Houston–Pasadena–The Woodlands metropolitan area is served by a public television station and one public radio station. KUHT (Houston Public Media PBS) is a PBS member station and is the first public television station in the United States. Houston Public Radio is listener-funded radio and comprises one NPR member station, KUHF (KUHF News). The University of Houston System owns and holds broadcasting licenses to KUHT and KUHF. The stations broadcast from the Melcher Center for Public Broadcasting, located on the campus of the University of Houston. The metropolitan area is also served by ABC 13 (KTRK-TV) and Fox 26 (KRIV-TV), owned-and-operated stations of ABC and Fox, and NBC and CBS affiliates KPRC 2 and KHOU 11.

The Houston area is served by the Houston Chronicle, its only major daily newspaper with wide distribution. The Hearst Corporation, which owns and operates the Houston Chronicle, bought the assets of the Houston Post—its long-time rival and main competition—when Houston Post ceased operations in 1995. The Houston Post was owned by the family of former Lieutenant Governor Bill Hobby of Houston. The only other major publication to serve the city is the Houston Press—a free alternative weekly with a weekly readership of more than 300,000.

The Galveston County Daily News, founded in 1842, is that city's primary newspaper and the oldest continuously printed newspaper in Texas. It currently serves as the newspaper of record for Galveston, as well as Galveston County. Radio station KGBC, on air since 1947, has also served as a local media outlet.

== Transportation ==
=== Highways ===
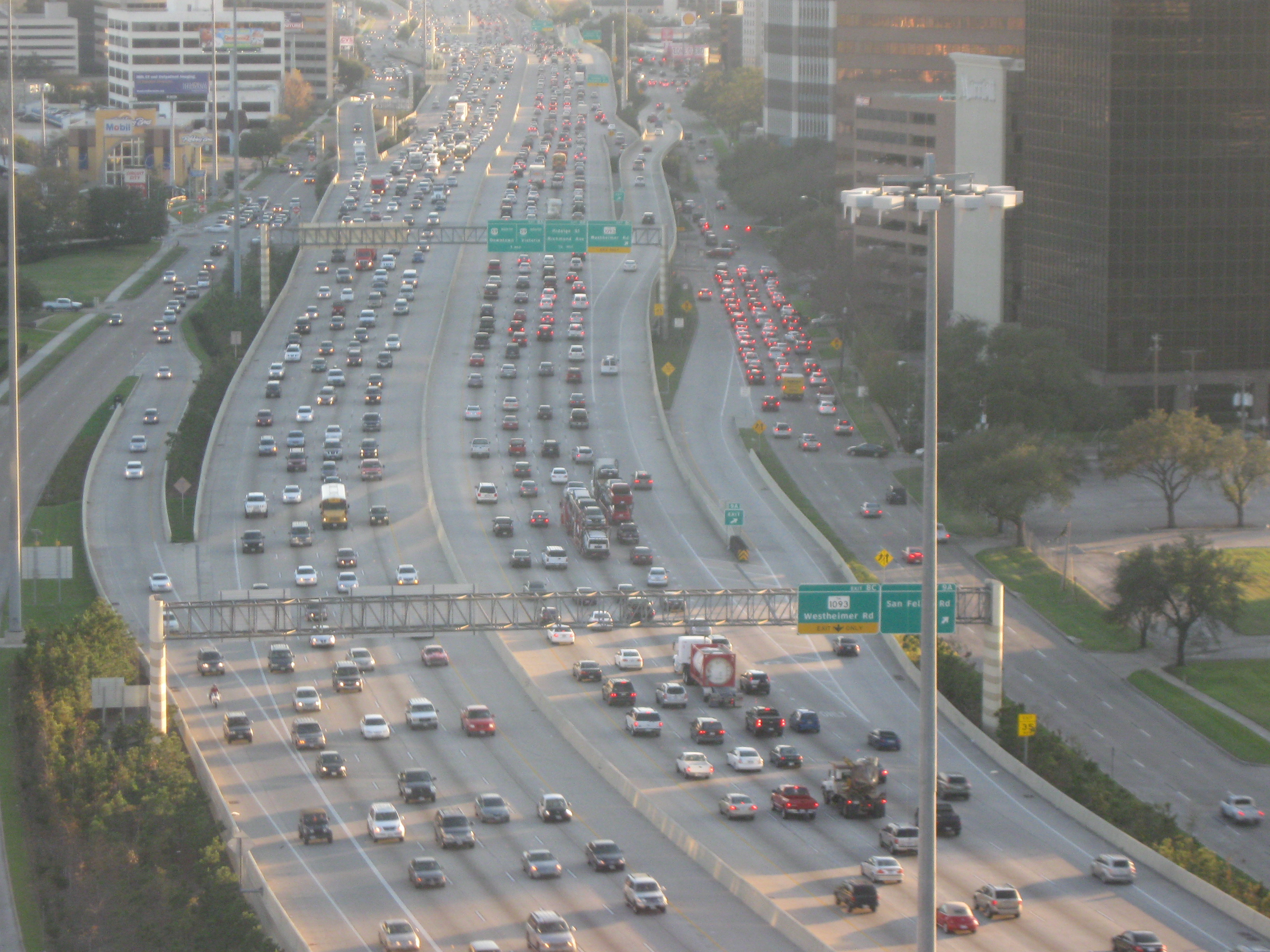
Interstate 610 in Uptown Houston

Greater Houston's freeway system includes 3,448 miles (5,549.0 km) of freeways and expressways in the 7 counties that constitute TxDOT's Houston District, which are Brazoria, Fort Bend, Galveston, Harris, Montgomery, and Waller Counties. The State of Texas plans to spend $65 billion on Houston area highways by 2025. Houston freeways are heavily traveled and often under construction to meet the demands of continuing growth.

The Greater Houston area has a hub-and-spoke freeway structure with multiple loops. The innermost is Interstate 610, forming a roughly 42-mile (70 km)-circumference loop around downtown. The nearly square Loop 610 is quartered into "North Loop", "South Loop", "West Loop", and "East Loop". The roads of Beltway 8 and their freeway core, the Sam Houston Tollway, are the next loop, at a diameter around 83 miles (134 km). A planned highway project, State Highway 99 (the Grand Parkway), will form the third loop outside of Houston. Currently, a completed portion of State Highway 99 runs clockwise from I-69/US 59 in Sugar Land, southwest of Houston to State Highway 146 in Baytown, east of Houston and was completed in 2022. When completed in the future, I-69 will start at the Mexico–US border, go through the Greater Houston area, and continue on to Michigan at the Canada–US border. All of I-69 has been completed in the Greater Houston area and is co-signed with U.S. Highway 59. Interstate 45, which starts at State Highway 75 in Dallas provides transport from Houston to Dallas.

=== Mass transit ===
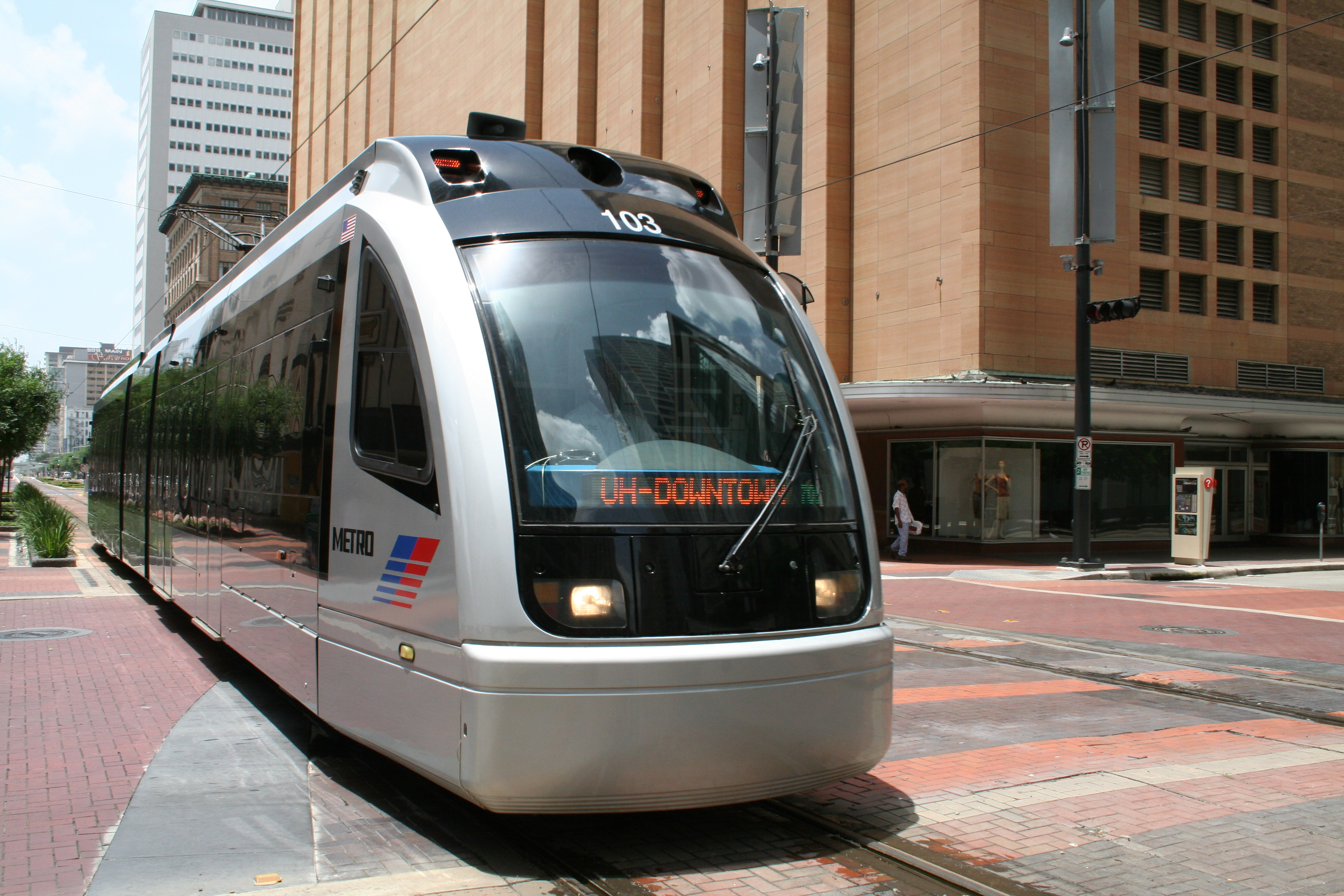
METRORail in downtown Houston

The Metropolitan Transit Authority of Harris County (METRO) provides public transportation in the form of buses, light rail, high-occupancy vehicle (HOV) lanes, and paratransit to fifteen municipalities throughout the Greater Houston area and parts of unincorporated Harris County. As of 2016, METRO's service area covers 1,303 square miles (3,370 km^{2}) containing a population of 3.6 million.

The Woodlands Express provides a park and ride service for transit between The Woodlands and Houston.

Some areas in east Harris County are served by Harris County Transit.

=== Airports ===
Houston's largest airport George Bush Intercontinental Airport, is located in north Houston. It is the second largest hub for United Airlines.

In 2010, Continental Airlines moved its headquarters from downtown Houston to downtown Chicago upon its merger with United Airlines. The southeast of Houston has William P. Hobby Airport, the second-largest commercial passenger airport. Houston's third-largest airport is Ellington Field, which houses several National Guard and Air National Guard units, as well as a United States Coast Guard air station and the Lyndon B. Johnson Space Center's fleet of jets that are used to train astronauts. Sugar Land has the Sugar Land Regional Airport, which is the fourth-largest airport in the metropolitan area. Both Sugar Land Regional and Ellington Field serve as reliever airports for the Houston Airport System.

=== Intercity rail ===
Amtrak provides intercity rail service to the Houston station.

=== Intercity bus ===
Greyhound Bus Lines operates services from three bus stations in the City of Houston:

- Houston Greyhound Station at 2121 South Main Street
- Americanos U.S. L.L.C. (Houston Southeast) at 7218 Harrisburg Boulevard.
- Agencia Autobuses (Houston Southwest) at 6590 Southwest Freeway

In addition, Greyhound operates services from two stops

- Houston Aau
- Houston (Amtrak station)

Greyhound also operates services to stops within other cities in the Greater Houston area, including:

- Angleton (at Save Step Food Mart)
- Baytown (at Baytown Travel Express)
- Conroe (at Shell)
- Katy (at Sunmart Texaco)
- Prairie View (at Unco Food Store)
- Rosenberg (at Shell-McDonald's)

Three Megabus stations additionally serve the Houston area:

- Downtown – a parking lot located at 815 Pierce Street across the street from METRO's Downtown Transit Center
- Northwest Houston – a Shell gas station located at 13250 FM 1960
- Katy Mills Mall – at Entrance 5, 5000 Katy Mills Circle

== See also ==
- Harris County, Texas
