= Chappell, Nebraska =

- City
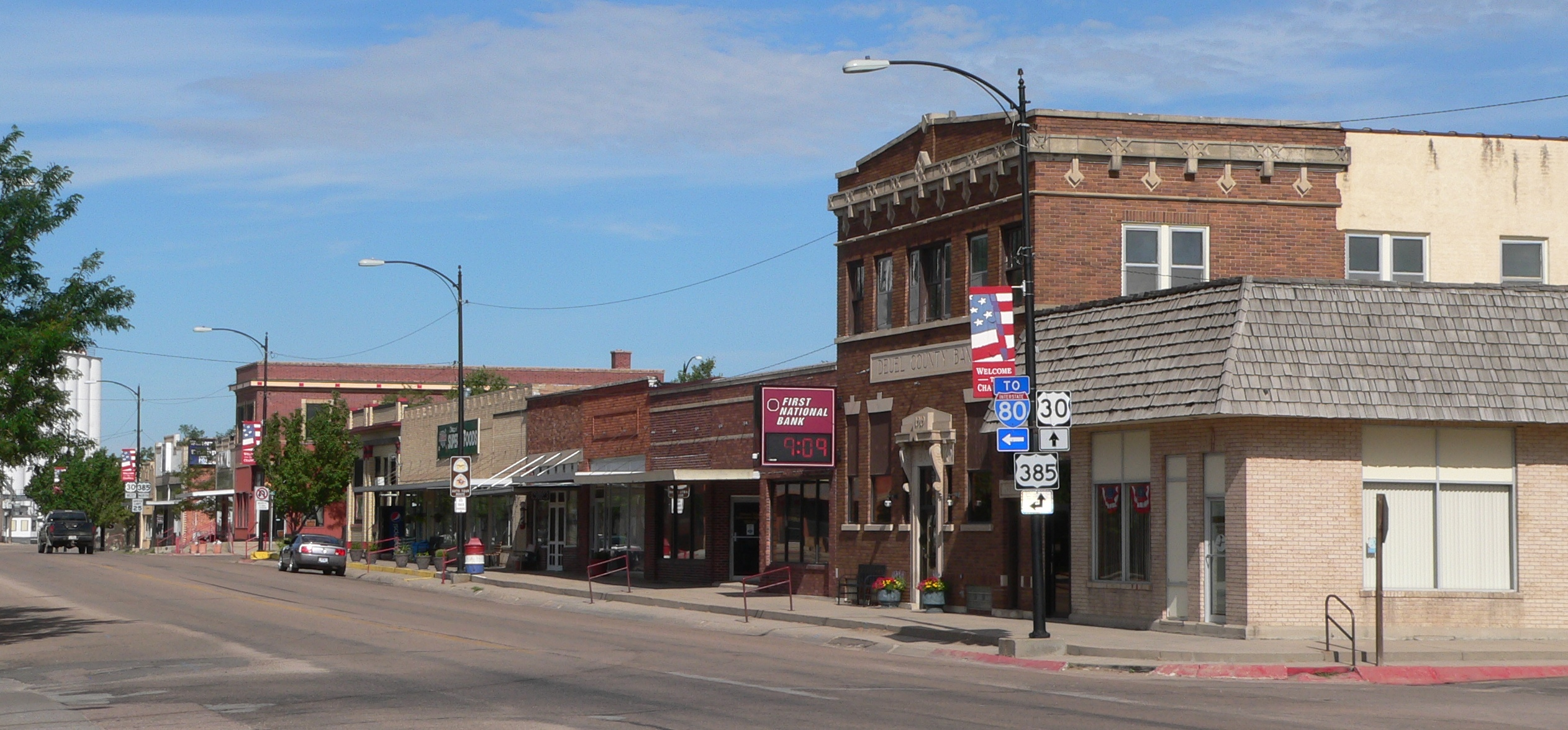
- Downtown Chappell: Second Street

- Location within Deuel County and Nebraska
- Coordinates: 41°05′29″N 102°28′12″W
- Country: United States
- State: Nebraska
- County: Deuel

Area
  - Total: 0.70 sq mi (1.82 km^{2})
  - Land: 0.70 sq mi (1.82 km^{2})
  - Water: 0 sq mi (0.00 km^{2})
- Elevation: 3,691 ft (1,125 m)

Population (2020)
  - Total: 844
  - Density: 1,201.9/sq mi (464.06/km^{2})
- Time zone: UTC-7 (Mountain (MST))
  - Summer (DST): UTC-6 (MDT)
- ZIP code: 69129
- Area code: 308
- FIPS code: 31-08885
- GNIS feature ID: 2393801
- Website: chappellne.org

Chappell (/ˈtʃæpəl/) is a city in and the county seat of Deuel County, Nebraska, United States. As of the 2020 census, Chappell had a population of 844.

== History ==
Chappell was platted in 1884 when the railroad was extended to that point. It was named for Charles Henry Chappell, a railroad official.

== Geography ==
According to the United States Census Bureau, the city has a total area of 0.70 square miles (1.81 km^{2}), all of which is land.

== Demographics ==
Historical population
Census	Pop.	Note	%±
1910	329		—
1920	1,131		243.8%
1930	1,061		−6.2%
1940	1,093		3.0%
1950	1,297		18.7%
1960	1,280		−1.3%
1970	1,204		−5.9%
1980	1,095		−9.1%
1990	979		−10.6%
2000	983		0.4%
2010	929		−5.5%
2020	844		−9.1%
U.S. Decennial Census

=== 2010 census ===
As of the census of 2010, there were 929 people, 412 households, and 257 families residing in the city. The population density was 1,327.1 inhabitants per square mile (512.4/km^{2}). There were 484 housing units at an average density of 691.4 per square mile (267.0/km^{2}). The racial makeup of the city was 98.0% White, 0.4% Native American, 0.2% Asian, 0.4% from other races, and 1.0% from two or more races. Hispanic or Latino of any race were 1.9% of the population.

There were 412 households, of which 27.2% had children under the age of 18 living with them, 49.5% were married couples living together, 10.2% had a female householder with no husband present, 2.7% had a male householder with no wife present, and 37.6% were non-families. 33.5% of all households were made up of individuals, and 18% had someone living alone who was 65 years of age or older. The average household size was 2.20 and the average family size was 2.81.

The median age in the city was 47.7 years. 23.7% of residents were under the age of 18; 5% were between the ages of 18 and 24; 18.7% were from 25 to 44; 27.4% were from 45 to 64; and 25.2% were 65 years of age or older. The gender makeup of the city was 46.9% male and 53.1% female.

=== 2000 census ===
As of the census of 2000, there were 983 people, 437 households, and 277 families residing in the city. The population density was 1,843.9 inhabitants per square mile (711.9/km^{2}). There were 482 housing units at an average density of 904.1 per square mile (349.1/km^{2}). The racial makeup of the city was 97.56% White, 0.10% African American, 0.41% Native American, 0.31% Asian, 0.81% from other races, and 0.81% from two or more races. Hispanic or Latino of any race were 1.22% of the population.

There were 437 households, out of which 24.7% had children under the age of 18 living with them, 53.3% were married couples living together, 6.9% had a female householder with no husband present, and 36.6% were non-families. 33.9% of all households were made up of individuals, and 18.1% had someone living alone who was 65 years of age or older. The average household size was 2.20 and the average family size was 2.81.

In the city, the population was spread out, with 22.5% under the age of 18, 5.2% from 18 to 24, 24.2% from 25 to 44, 23.8% from 45 to 64, and 24.3% who were 65 years of age or older. The median age was 43 years. For every 100 females, there were 89.8 males. For every 100 females age 18 and over, there were 90.0 males.

As of 2000 the median income for a household in the city was $35,000, and the median income for a family was $44,659. Males had a median income of $27,431 versus $24,792 for females. The per capita income for the city was $19,312. About 3.6% of families and 8.2% of the population were below the poverty line, including 12.1% of those under age 18 and 6.9% of those age 65 or over.

== Climate ==
Climate data for Chappell, Nebraska (1981–2010)
Month	Jan	Feb	Mar	Apr	May	Jun	Jul	Aug	Sep	Oct	Nov	Dec	Year
Mean daily maximum °F (°C)	41.7 (5.4)	41.3 (5.2)	54.0 (12.2)	61.7 (16.5)	71.4 (21.9)	82.1 (27.8)	89.8 (32.1)	86.8 (30.4)	78.0 (25.6)	63.5 (17.5)	50.4 (10.2)	41.2 (5.1)	63.5 (17.5)
Mean daily minimum °F (°C)	14.9 (−9.5)	15.5 (−9.2)	25.7 (−3.5)	34.1 (1.2)	44.0 (6.7)	54.4 (12.4)	61.8 (16.6)	58.4 (14.7)	48.1 (8.9)	34.9 (1.6)	23.3 (−4.8)	15.1 (−9.4)	35.9 (2.2)
Average precipitation inches (mm)	0.39 (9.9)	0.55 (14)	1.06 (27)	2.73 (69)	1.96 (50)	3.93 (100)	2.21 (56)	2.67 (68)	1.64 (42)	1.34 (34)	0.44 (11)	0.27 (6.9)	19.19 (487)
Average snowfall inches (cm)	4.1 (10)	3.5 (8.9)	4.2 (11)	3.8 (9.7)	0.9 (2.3)	0.0 (0.0)	0.0 (0.0)	0.0 (0.0)	0.0 (0.0)	1.5 (3.8)	3.3 (8.4)	3.0 (7.6)	24.3 (62)
Source: NOAA

== Notable people ==
- Richard N. Cabela - Cofounded Cabela's
- Frank W. Cyr - Organized the United States' first national standards conference for school transportation in 1939
- L. Steven Grasz - Judge on the United States Court of Appeals for the Eighth Circuit
- Virginia D. Smith - Republican member of the United States House of Representatives from 1975 to 1991 from the Third Congressional District of Nebraska
