= Richard N. Cabela =

American entrepreneur (1936–2014)

- Born: Richard Neil Cabela; October 8, 1936; Chappell, Nebraska, U.S.
- Died: February 17, 2014 (aged 77); Sidney, Nebraska, U.S.
- Other names: Dick Cabela
- Occupation: Entrepreneur
- Known for: Cabela's co-founder

Richard Neil "Dick" Cabela (October 8, 1936 – February 17, 2014) was an American entrepreneur, best known as a co-founder of Cabela's, a leading outfitter of outdoor sporting and recreational goods. He stated that his business was inspired by his bout with polio and a deep love of hunting and fishing. He was also described as "a vocal supporter of the National Rifle Association of America" and a hunter who decorated his home with taxidermic wildlife.

== Biography ==
Born in Chappell, Nebraska, Cabela and his father, who were both of Italian heritage, went to Chicago to purchase items for the family furniture store back home. Initially he placed ads in a local newspaper for "12 hand tied flies for $1". When the items did not sell locally, he advertised them in national newspapers and magazines such as Sports Afield. He and wife, Mary, built a customer base and created a small mimeographed catalog to offer more fishing gear.

From 1961, the Cabelas, Dick, his wife Mary, and his brother James, created a catalog business with annual revenues of over US$3 billion, featuring stores in Alaska, Arizona, Colorado, Georgia, Idaho, Illinois, Kansas, Kentucky, Maine, Michigan, Minnesota, Missouri, Montana, Nebraska, Nevada, North Carolina, North Dakota, Oregon, Pennsylvania, South Dakota, Texas, Utah, Washington, West Virginia, and Wisconsin, and shipping goods and 120 million catalogs each year to all 50 states and many foreign nations. Additionally, the business inspired the creation of a financial institution and credit card issuer called the Worlds Foremost Bank.

He died on February 17, 2014, at his home in Sidney, Nebraska, at age 77.

== Honors ==
Cabela was the recipient of several awards over the course of his career. Among the awards Cabela received were the C.J. McElroy award in 2001 from the Safari Club International and the Golden Bullseye Pioneer award from NRA Publications in 2008.
