= John Madson =

American journalist

John Madson (1923 in Ames, Iowa – April 19, 1995 in Alton, Illinois) was a naturalist, conservationist, journalist, and freelancer who worked in the field of outdoor writing. Over time his work concentrated on the celebration of the vanished tallgrass prairie ecosystems of the U.S. Midwest, and he won acclaim from his publisher as "the father of the modern prairie restoration movement."

Madson, a Norwegian-American, served with the U.S. Army Air Forces in World War II. As a young adult he took a degree in wildlife biology at Iowa State University (1951), and then worked with the Iowa Conservation Commission. He subsequently worked as a reporter for the Des Moines Register, and then became a freelance writer. In later life he lived in Godfrey, Illinois. Madson published frequently in the 1961-1977 period in conservationists' and sportsmens' publications such as Audubon, Field and Stream, Guns and Ammo, Outdoor Life, and Sports Afield. His love of field sports, both fishing and hunting, carried him from high grounds, such as the South Dakota Badlands, to the wet bottomlands of the Mississippi River. Over time, as he stalked upland birds such as pheasants, he learned more about the ways of native North American tall grass. This drew him toward publication of his appreciation of the largely-lost network of tallgrass prairie ecosystems in Where the Sky Began (1982).

== Legacy and honors ==
Madson, who died in 1995, has been named an "OWAA Legend" by the Outdoor Writers Association of America. Four of Madson's books remained in print as of 2017, published by the University of Iowa Press.

== Quotes ==
- "I have sworn to never write another piece about pheasant hunting. Enough is enough!"
- "You and I are among the luckiest writers in the world – among the luckiest of all time: we are writing in English. It has to be the broadest, most expressive, and most superbly equipped tongue of all time. No other language can match it for sheer depth of vocabulary."

== Bibliography ==
- Where the Sky Began: Land of the Tallgrass Prairie (1982)
- Tall Grass Prairie (1993)
- Out Home (2010 anthology)
- Up on the River: People and Wildlife of the Upper Mississippi (2011 reprint)
- Stories from under the Sky (2012 anthology)
