= Premium Outlets Montreal =

Outlet mall in Mirabel, Quebec, Canada

- Location: Mirabel, Quebec, Canada
- Coordinates: 45°40′26″N 73°55′09″W
- Address: 19001 Chemin Notre-Dame, Mirabel, Quebec J7J 0T1
- Opened: October 30, 2014
- Developer: Simon Property Group, Calloway Real Estate Investment Trust, SmartCentres
- Manager: Sylvie Laporte
- Owner: Simon's Premium Outlets
- Num. of stores: 84
- Floor area: 365,500 sq ft (33,960 m^{2})
- Website: http://www.premiumoutlets.com/outlets/outlet.asp?id=114&lang=en

Premium Outlets Montreal is an outlet mall in Mirabel, Quebec, Canada. Being the second Premium Outlet Centre in Canada, and the second conglomeration of stores of its type in that country (after Toronto Premium Outlets), the facility opened on October 30, 2014.

The mall is built on the site of the planned but never built Lac-Mirabel super-regional shopping and recreation project.
