= Cabela's Outdoor Adventures =

Cabela's Outdoor Adventures may refer to different video games with the same name:

- Cabela's Outdoor Adventures (2005 video game), a 2005 video game
- Cabela's Outdoor Adventures (2009 video game), a 2009 video game
