= Coastal Prairie Conservancy =

U.S. non-profit organization

Coordinates: 29.7221°N 95.4185°W

- Formation: 1992; 33 years ago
- Type: Nonprofit
- Tax ID no.: 76-0377029
- Legal status: 501(c)(3)
- Purpose: Conservation and Restoration
- Headquarters: Houston, Texas
- Board Chairman: Sam Hix
- President & Chief Executive Officer: Mary Anne Piacentini
- Board of directors: Sam Hix; Michael Huffmaster; C. Foster Carter; Iris Poteet; Andres Cabada; Robin Fredrickson; Kirk Johnson; Jessica Jubin; Molly McBirney; Juliana Spinola; Forrest Wylie
- Website: www.coastalprairieconservancy.org
- Formerly called: Katy Prairie Conservancy

Coastal Prairie Conservancy was established in 1992 to conserve Katy Prairie, part of the Western Gulf coastal grasslands located in Texas, United States. Approximately 24,500 acres is under conservation easements or owned by CPC in western Harris and Waller Counties.

== Preserves ==
=== Nelson Farms Preserve ===
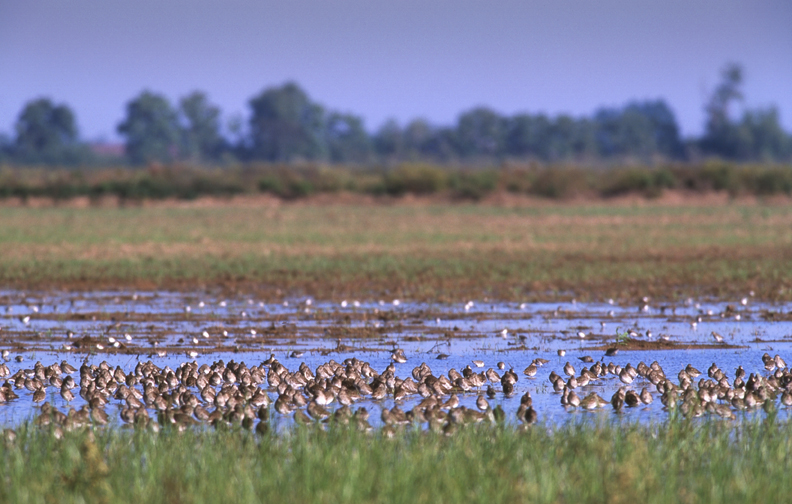
Nelson Farm

Nelson Farms Preserve encompasses more than 1,700 acres, of which 200 acres still operates as a working rice farm. Cypress Creek flows through the preserve and the combination of habitat types attracts waterfowl, waterbirds, migratory songbirds, raptors, beaver, white-tailed deer and other wildlife.

=== Warren Ranch ===
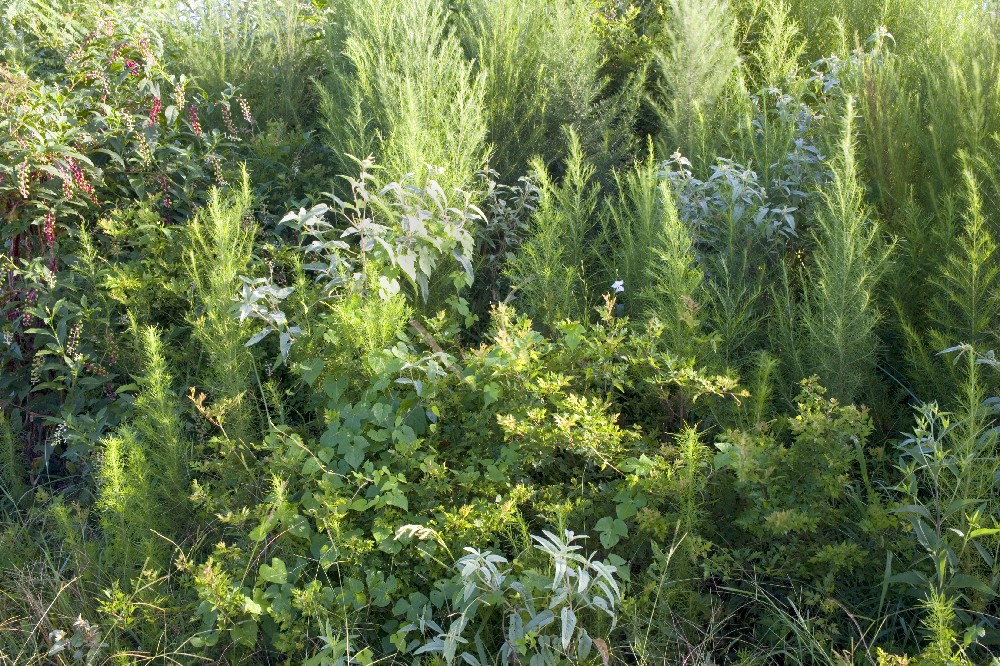
Warren Ranch

Warren Ranch is one of the largest remaining working cattle ranches on the prairie.

=== Williams Prairie Preserve ===
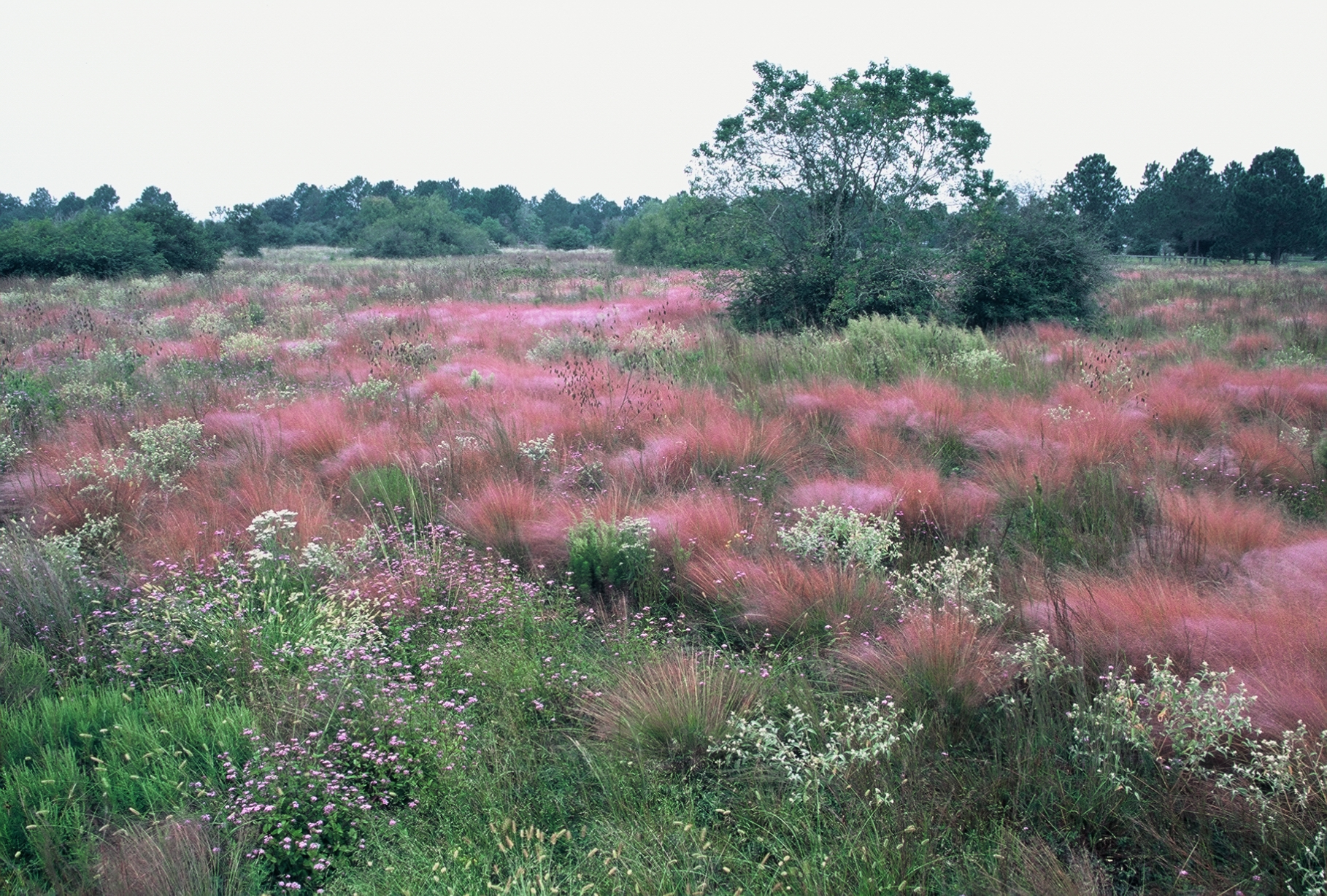
Williams Prairie photographed by Michael Morton

Williams Prairie is a 10-acre prairie remnant where little bluestem, brownseed Paspalum, and indiangrass grow. Egrets and other herons reside in the depressions during the warmer months as long as they contain water.

== Other protected areas on the Katy Prairie ==
=== West Side Airport Wetlands Mitigation Area ===
In 1986, the City of Houston purchased 1,432 acres for a potential future airport on Morton Road near the western edge of the Katy Prairie. During the expansion of this airport the a area was set aside to compensate migratory birds for the habitat destroyed by the airport.

=== John Paul Landing Park ===
John Paul Landing Park is an 865-acre public park operated by Harris County and located on Katy-Hockley Road and Sharp Road on the Katy Prairie. The project ncludes 400-acre lake as well as an environmental education center.

=== Paul D. Rushing Park ===
Paul D. Rushing Park is a 232-acre public park operated by Harris County, located at 9114 Katy Hockley Road on the Katy Prairie. This park includes a lake and wildlife viewing area.

=== Katy Park ===
Katy Park is a municipal park located inside the City of Katy.
