= Sports Afield =

American magazine

- A 2012 Sports Afield magazine cover.
- Editor in Chief: Diana Rupp
- CEO: Ludo Wurfbain
- Frequency: Bimonthly
- Founder: Claude King
- Founded: 1887
- Company: Field Sports Publishing Inc
- Country: United States
- Based in: Huntington Beach, California
- Language: English
- Website: www.sportsafield.com
- ISSN: 0038-8149

Sports Afield (SA) is an American outdoor magazine headquartered in Huntington Beach, California. Founded in 1887 by Claude King as a hunting and fishing magazine, it is the oldest published outdoor magazine in North America. The first issue, in January 1888, was eight pages long; it was printed on newspaper stock and published in Denver, Colorado. The magazine currently publishes six print issues per year as well as a digital edition, with an editorial focus on worldwide big-game hunting and conservation. In addition to publishing the magazine, Sports Afield licenses its name to branded products including safes, clothing, outdoor equipment, a TV show, and real-estate marketing. Sports Afield is one of the “Big Three” in American outdoor magazines together with Field & Stream and Outdoor Life, and is the only one published in a printed edition currently.

== "Journal for Gentlemen" ==
Upon its founding, Sports Afield was subtitled “A Journal for Gentlemen” and promised, in Claude King's words, “To be devoted to hunting, fishing, rifle and trap shooting, the breeding of thorough-bred dogs, cycling, and kindred sports…” The subscription price was $1.50 per year, with single copies selling for 15 cents. A few years later, King expounded on his philosophy: “Sports Afield has an ambition above that of simply entertaining and amusing the public; it wants to help propagate the true spirit of gentle sportsmanship, to encourage indulgence in outdoor recreations, and to assist in the dissemination of knowledge regarding natural history, photography, firearms, and kindred subjects.”

By 1890, Sports Afield had expanded and moved its operations to Chicago. In 1927, King stepped down as editor and turned the reins over to Joe Godfrey. Zane Grey started writing for the magazine, as did Jimmy Robinson, beginning a 60-year association with the publication. In 1930, Ivan B. Romig and his associates took over Sports Afield, combined it with a smaller publication—Trails of the Northwoods—and moved the offices to Minneapolis. A string of editors worked the helm of Sports Afield, which struggled during the Great Depression years to stay afloat. It did, and by 1934 the magazine was in the black.

A classic Sports Afield cover.

Sports Afield was an early advocate of conservation. Its credo was: “We believe in sane conservation, we oppose pollution, and we stand for the enforcement of our game laws.” In the 1930s, Gordon MacQuarrie and Archibald Rutledge joined as writers, and the circulation rose to 250,000. In 1945, Ted Kesting, an associate editor of Country Gentleman magazine, was hired as editorial director and brought from Philadelphia to Minneapolis. His assignment was to expand and modernize Sports Afield. Only 26 years of age, he was the youngest editor of a major national publication in the United States.

Kesting soon signed up more writers. One he brought on board was angling editor Jason Lucas, whose writings about bass fishing became very popular. Another was mystery writer Erle Stanley Gardner, who became known for his articles defending gun owners' and hunters’ rights. By October 1948, TIME reported that Sports Afield had become the biggest of all outdoor monthlies. "Last week it put to bed a November issue that would go to 800,000 customers, a record for its sixty-one years. Colorful as a hatband full of flies, it was filled with picture stories and crackling adventure stuff…”

== Purchase by Hearst ==
A 1960 Sports Afield cover.

In 1953, Hearst magazines tendered an offer to Walter Taylor, the publisher, providing Kesting and his staff came along. The sale was made, and Sports Afield moved its offices to New York City. Meanwhile, the magazine continued to grow, attracting such writers as Col. Townsend Whelen, Jack Denton Scott, and Russell Annabel. Circulation hit the 1,100,000 mark in 1961. By the late 1960s, Homer Circle, Tom Paugh, and Zack Taylor had joined the ranks. The cover price jumped from 35 cents to 50 cents a copy.

In 1970, Kesting announced he was stepping down as editor and named Lamar Underwood as his replacement. Under Underwood's guidance, Gene Hill, Nick Lyons, Vance Bourjaily, and John Madson all appeared in the periodical's pages.

When Underwood moved on, he was replaced by saltwater fishing editor Tom Paugh. The Paugh years saw major redesigns, plus a downsizing in circulation as the magazine adjusted to competitive times. Grits Gresham, Thomas McIntyre, and Anthony Acerrano all wrote for the magazine, which continued to publish not only adventure stories mixed with how-to-do-it pieces but also to comment on conservation issues as well.

== The magazine today ==
In the late 1990s, the magazine entered the most difficult period in its long history. Hearst executives shifted the magazine's focus from hunting and fishing to camping, hiking, mountain biking, and other “non-consumptive” outdoor sports. The strategy failed, however, and in the summer of 2000, Hearst sold the magazine to Robert E. Petersen, who subsequently moved the magazine's offices to the Los Angeles area. Petersen returned the magazine to its traditional focus on hunting and fishing with the May 2000 issue but the publication found it difficult to regain a mass audience for this format, and in June 2002 it suspended publication.

In the fall of 2002, Field Sports Publishing Inc. (FSP) purchased the rights to publish the magazine from Robert E. Petersen. The owners decided to return Sports Afield to its original core and focus the magazine on the traveling big-game hunter. Diana Rupp became the new editor; the new owners published their first issue in March 2003. In 2009 the remaining intellectual property rights to the Sports Afield name were purchased by FSP, and today Sports Afield is one of a few outdoor magazines with a high-profile name that owns all the rights to its name.

== Sports Afield Brand ==
Before World War II, the Sports Afield brand was applied to some products, but it is not known if these were licensed goods or items made at the behest of Sports Afield. Occasionally such Sports Afield-branded items made before 1940 appear on internet auction sites such as eBay. After World War II, the Sports Afield brand became available on clothing, rugs, and footwear. These were license programs whereby manufacturers paid for the use of the Sports Afield name on their products. These programs continued through the decades with the Sports Afield name used on various categories of goods ranging from sporting guns to fishing gear to snow boots.

After the sale of the magazine by Hearst to Robert E. Petersen in 2000, the licensing program was taken over by Mahco Products of Arkansas. Mahco primarily concentrated on clothing and compact optics. After the sale to Field Sports Publishing in 2002, management of the brand was taken in-house, and new licensing contracts were entered into for an expanded range of products. In 2014, an agreement was made with Sports Afield Consumer Products to manufacture safes for firearms and personal security. Several licenses for clothing items were made between 2006 and 2021. Other product categories included backpacks, cloth decorated with Sports Afield magazine cover art, rubber boots, sunglasses, and canvas sports bags.

In 2011 the World of Sports Afield television program was launched. Produced by Safari Classics Productions of Dallas, it was initially hosted by Craig Boddington and since that time has been hosted at various times by Shane Mahoney, Aaron Nielson, Dave Fulson, Dan Catlin, and James Reed. It runs on the Sportsman Channel with new shows launching each year between July and December. It covers adventure travel and hunting, mainly in North America and Africa, with some Asian travel.

== Sports Afield Trophy Properties ==
In March 2014, Field Sports Publishing Inc., the owners of Sports Afield, bought Cabela's Trophy Properties and renamed it Sports Afield Trophy Properties (SATP). Sports Afield Trophy Properties is a real-estate marketing company that focuses on agricultural lands, woods and forests, and recreational property listings. Its services are offered to independent real-estate brokers who get an exclusive territory within the network. The marketing consists of websites, social media, syndications to multiple listing services, printed media, and cross-promotions to other platforms in the company group.

A trophy property is a real estate term for the top 2% of properties in a given subcategory, and may refer to residences, architecturally or historically preserved properties, agricultural lands that have high yields, high-amenity natural land and properties with extensive views or other amenities.

== See also ==
- Corey Ford
- Outside (magazine)
