= Campmor =

US outdoor recreation equipment retailer

Campmor, Inc.
- Type: Private
- Industry: Retail
- Founded: 1978; 48 years ago
- Headquarters: Paramus, New Jersey
- Number of locations: Retail store in Paramus, New Jersey, and corporate offices Mahwah, New Jersey
- Products: Outdoor gear, tents, sleeping bags, clothing, footwear
- Website: campmor.com

Campmor, Inc. is an outdoor recreation equipment retailer established in Bogota, New Jersey, in 1978. The company sells outdoor camping gear and camping equipment. Campmor's warehousing and order processing facilities are located in Paramus, New Jersey.

== History ==
Campmor started in a New Jersey garage in 1978. In its early years, the company was primarily a mail-order company with one retail store in Paramus, New Jersey. The company then evolved to a largely online model, launching its ecommerce site in 1998.

== See also ==
- Academy Sports + Outdoors
- Bass Pro Shops
- Cabela's
- Dick's Sporting Goods
- Dunham's Sports
- Eastern Mountain Sports
- Evo
- Legendary Whitetails
- Mountain Equipment Co-op
- REI
- Scheels
- Sierra
- Sportsman's Warehouse
- Vista Outdoor
