= The Sportsman's Guide =

American outdoor goods retailer

Sportsman's Guide
- Company type: Subsidiary
- Industry: Internet & Retail
- Founded: 1970; 56 years ago
- Founder: Gary Olen
- Headquarters: 411 Farwell Avenue, South St. Paul, MN 55075, South St. Paul, Minnesota, USA
- Area served: North America, South America, Europe & Asia Pacific
- Products: Clothing, outdoor gear, ammunition, shooting supplies
- Services: Online and catalog retailer; liquidation store attached to headquarters.
- Owner: BHG Ventures
- Website: www.sportsmansguide.com

Sportsman's Guide is an online retailer of hunting and fishing gear, military surplus, ammunition, and outdoor sporting goods. Founded by Gary Olen in 1970, its first catalog was mailed in 1976.

Based in South St. Paul, Minnesota, the company reportedly employed about 700 people in 2012. The Sportsman's Guide catalog website and retail store all operate from the 330,000-square-foot building located on Farwell Avenue.

== History ==
Sportsman's Guide was founded by Gary Olen, getting its start in his basement in the winter of 1970. The first product, a patch for hunting jackets detailing the previous year's trophy success, immediately proved popular with hunters across the country.

The first Sportsman's Guide catalog was just one page, and it was delivered at the time of the opening of the hunting season in 1977. By 1992, The Guide was mailing eight outdoor gear and clothing catalogs annually, and by 2012, the number had risen to 63.

In 2006, it was acquired by the wholly-owned American subsidiary of the Redcats group, which is the home-shopping group owned by French luxury and distribution group PPR. Six years later, when it was purchased by Northern Tool + Equipment and no job cuts were expected, new jobs were anticipated.

In August 2021, it was announced that The Guide had been acquired by the Southfield, Michigan-based private investment firm BHG Ventures.

== Private Label Brands ==
Sportsman's Guide also has several private label brands made up of items designed and sourced by company team members: Bolderton, Guide Gear, HuntRite, Castlecreek, and HQ ISSUE.

== Buyer’s Club ==
Sportsman's Guide Buyer's Club Advantage Catalog was introduced in January 1995. Members pay an annual fee to receive various discounts and other benefits.

== Criticisms ==
Multiple criticisms arose for the quality of the products sold, such as: torn seams, dented products, products full of mildew, etc.

Criticisms also arose for the customer service quality, such as revoking the Buyer's Club discount on ammo for buying in bulk quantities.

== See also ==
- Academy Sports + Outdoors
- Bass Pro Shops
- Cabela's
- Dick's Sporting Goods
- Legendary Whitetails
- REI
- Scheels
- Sportsman's Warehouse
- List of Minnesota companies
