= 2026 Colorado Amendment 83 =

Amendment 83
- November 3, 2026
- Right to Hunt and Fish
- as of 2026-11-5 1:18:14 PM [[Mountain Time Zone[MST]]
- Outcome: TBD
- Website: https://results.enr.clarityelections.com/CO/127407/web.345435/#/detail/6020?voteType=ALL&precinct=ALL

Results
Choice	Votes	%
Yes	1,068,104	45.32%
No	1,288,549	54.68%
- Post-Election Reporting In Progress

2026 Colorado Amendment 83 is a citizen-proposed ballot measure that would establish in the Colorado constitution the right to hunt and fish certain wild animals through the use of "traditional methods" and that the preferred management method for those species is hunting and fishing. It does not apply to animals that are not traditionally hunted or fished in Colorado. "Traditional methods" is not defined anywhere in Colorado law, and could potentially apply to controversial practices like hound hunting of bears, luring bears with piles of bait, or trapping.

== Background ==
Colorado wildlife populations are managed by Colorado Parks and Wildlife (CPW) who regulates hunting and fishing as defined by the CPW Commission. The CPW Commission is a governor-appointed board of citizens. Current Colorado law requires that wildlife and their environment be "protected, preserved, enhanced, and managed for the use, benefit, and enjoyment" of both citizens of Colorado and visitors to the state. In 1992, 1996, and 2020, Colorado limited through legislation the ways in which wildlife could be killed in order to support humane treatment of the animals. Proponents of this measure have spent around $2.51 million while opponents have spent $142,784 as of the Oct 19, 2026 Secretary of State's deadline. Twenty-four other states in the U.S. have the constitutional right to hunt and fish including Vermont, which was the first state to add it in 1777. All other states have added a constitutional amendment since 1996. However, the vast majority of the language from those other states does not go as far as Amendment 83 does.

Proponents of this amendment argue that it seeks to limit efforts to get rid of hunting and fishing in Colorado. There is also support in order to maintain the status quo of hunting in wildlife management in Colorado. A large portion of groups who have supported this measure are from outside of Colorado, including the International Order of T. Roosevelt (Wisconsin), Hunter Action Fund (Texas), Safari Club International (Texas), Congressional Sportsmen's Foundation (Washington DC), and Wild Sheep Foundation (Montana). On October 23, the American Excellence Foundation, a Virginia-based "network of investors focused on advancing the conservative cause," also donated $475,000 to the Yes on 83 committee.

Opponents of this amendment say that the Constitution is not the right place for hunting and fishing to be protected and it is an unnecessary step because hunting and fishing are already legal. There is also concern that this could endanger the current rules and regulations of the industry. Opponents also worry that the ballot language "by traditional methods" could lead to inhumane treatment of Colorado's wildlife. It is argued that using legislation to determine what is reasonable and humane is subject to change over time which would not be reflected in a constitutional right. Opponents are concerned that with out-of-state funding supporting this measure, it does not fit the needs of Colorado and is instead part of a national agenda to add this language to multiple state constitutions.

There is estimated to be an increase in state spending over legal rulings and implementation of this new right.

== Contents ==
The proposition appears on the ballot as follows:

Shall there be an amendment to the Colorado Constitution creating a constitutional right to hunt, fish, and harvest fish and wildlife by traditional methods, including all species of fish and wildlife managed by the state except non-game species, endangered species, or any species that is illegal to hunt under federal law, and, in connection therewith, establishing hunting and fishing as the preferred means of managing fish and wildlife populations; and preserving the right of the state to regulate hunting, fishing, and wildlife management if necessary for sound scientific wildlife conservation and management, public safety, or to preserve the future of hunting and fishing opportunities for all species?

Yes vote would mean: hunting and fishing are a constitutional right in Colorado as well as the preferred method of wildlife management.

No vote would mean: hunting and fishing would continue as allowed under state and federal regulations.

== Campaigns ==
'Yes'

Organizations

- American Sportfishing Association
- Bass Pro Shops
- Coloradans For Responsible Wildlife Management
- Colorado Backcountry Hunters & Anglers
- Colorado Bowhunters Association
- Colorado Outfitters Association
- Colorado Sportsmen's Foundation
- Colorado Wildlife Conservation Project
- Colorado's Wildlife Deserve Better - with funding from organizations listed below
  - Colorado Trappers and Predator Hunters Association
  - The Congressional Sportsmen's Foundation
  - Hunter Action Fund
  - Safari Club International Colorado Chapter
  - Safari Club International
  - Rocky Mountain Bighorn Society
  - Wild Sheep Foundation
- Delta Waterfowl
- Ducks Unlimited
- Howl for Wildlife
- Hunt 2 Conserve
- Hunt to Conserve Colorado
- Independence Institute
- The International Order of T. Roosevelt AKA T. Roosevelt Conservation Alliance
- Let's Go Colorado
- National Rifle Association
- National Wildlife Federation
- National Wild Turkey Federation
- Pheasants Forever and Quail Forever
- Rocky Mountain Elk Foundation
- Society for the Conservation of Bighorn Sheep
- Theodore Roosevelt Conservation Partnership
- Union Sportsmen's Alliance
- Vote Yes on 83 - formed by law firm West Group - with funding from organizations listed below
  - Cowboy Up Hatters
  - Farrell-Roeh Capital
  - Joseph and Celeste O'Dea Living Trust
'No'

Elected Officials

- Jared Polis
- Phil Weiser

Organizations

- Animal Legal Defense Fund
- Animal Welfare Institute
- Animal Wellness Action
- Arkansas Valley Audubon Society
- Attorneys for Animals
- The Center for a Humane Economy
- Center for Biological Diversity Action Fund
- Colorado Bear Coalition
- Colorado Ceasefire
- Colorado Citizens Project
- Colorado Coalition Against Gun Violence
- Colorado Education Association
- Colorado Hunters and Anglers for Sensible Wildlife Conservation - with funding from organizations listed below
  - Sierra Club Denver Chapter
  - Prairie Protection Colorado
  - The Jefferson County Democratic Party
- Colorado Nature Action
- Colorado Wolf and Wildlife Center
- Colorado Voters for Animals
- ColoradoWild
- Common Cause Colorado
- Denver Audubon Society
- Denver Vegans
- Endangered Species Coalition
- Friends of Animals
- Health Care for All Colorado
- Humane Colorado
- Humane World for Animals (formerly the Humane Society)
- Indivisible Colorado
- League of Women Voters
- Living Rivers Colorado Riverkeeper
- Make Good Change
- Moms Demand Action for Gun Sense in America
- People for a Fair Colorado
- Pro-Animal Future
- Project Coyote
- Progress Now
- Protect Colorado's Constitution - with funding from organizations listed below
  - Science for Colorado Wildlife
- Rewilding America Now
- Roaring Audubon Society
- Rocky Mountain Wildlife Alliance
- Rocky Mountain Wild
- San Juan Citizens Alliance
- Science for Colorado Wildlife
- Sierra Club Colorado
- Southern Plains Land Trust
- Stop the Constitutional Power Grab - with funding from organizations listed below
  - Wildlife for All
  - Colorado Wild
- Voices Unidas
- Vote No 83
- WildEarth Guardians
- Wildlife for All
- Western Watersheds Project

== Results ==
Results for this ballot measure will begin to be published after polls close on November 3, 2026 at 7:00 pm. Amendment 83 requires a 55% majority to pass. Results listed are unofficial from the Secretary of State of Colorado.

Choice	Votes	%
For	1,058,598	45.29
Against	1,278,915	54.71
Required majority		55%
Total	2,337,513	100.00

== See also ==
- 2026 United States Ballot Measures
- List of Colorado Ballot Measures
