= Hole in the Horn Buck =

Notable dead white-tailed deer

The Hole in the Horn Buck is officially listed as the second largest non-typical white-tailed deer of all time by the Boone and Crockett Club. The buck’s antlers score 328 2/8 non-typical points. The name of the buck derives from the mysterious hole in the buck’s right antler. The hole came from the pub where the buck was hanging. One night a hole was drilled so wire could be used to keep the buck level on the wall.

== History ==
The Hole in the Horn buck was found dead along a railroad in Kent, Ohio in 1940. The buck was discovered by a group of railroad workers who had noticed the dead animal stuck under a nearby chain-link fence of the Ravenna Arsenal. The group of men freed the massive set of antlers. A shoulder mount of the buck was made by a local taxidermist and hung in the nearby Kent Canadian Club. It hung on the wall of the private hunting club for the next 40 years.

The world-record class mount was virtually anonymous to the public and had never been officially scored until 1983. The antlers were scored for the first time on August 27, 1983 by Phil Wright, chairman of the Boone & Crockett Scoring Committee. The initial score came out to be 342 3/8 non-typical points. Based upon the initial score, North American Whitetail Magazine declared the buck as the new world-record in the December 1983 issue of their magazine.

In 1986, the Hole in the Horn buck was re-measured by a judges’ panel of official Boone & Crockett scorers. The panel submitted a final score of 328 2/8, which placed it as the number two overall non-typical white-tailed deer, falling just short of the 333 7/8 measurement of the Missouri Monarch buck which was found in 1981 in St. Louis County, Missouri.

The Hole in the Horn buck is one of the most famous bucks in the world due to its enormous size, mysterious hole in the right antler, and controversial score. The Hole in the Horn buck was part of the original Legendary Whitetails collection owned by Larry Huffman. Replica mounts of the Hole in the Horn buck exist in many outdoor retail stores, including Cabela’s and Bass Pro Shops and also one hangs in the front office at Legendary Whitetails corporate headquarters. The original set of antlers was purchased with Larry’s entire collection of Legendary Whitetails by Bass Pro Shops in 2002. The mount now hangs in the King of Bucks collection in the American National Fish and Wildlife Museum in Springfield, Missouri.

== See also ==
- James Jordan Buck
- Boone and Crockett Club
- White-tailed Deer
- Deer hunting
