= James Jordan Buck =

Notable dead white-tailed deer

The James Jordan Buck is the 2nd-highest-scoring typical white-tailed deer ever harvested by a hunter in the United States (only behind the Huff buck) and the third-highest-scoring in the world. James (Jim) Jordan was a 22-year-old hunter from Burnett County, Wisconsin, when he shot the record buck on November 20, 1914. The Jordan Buck measures 206 1/8 net typical points under the Boone and Crockett Club scoring system.

== History ==
Jim Jordan was hunting with his friend Engus Davis in Danbury, Wisconsin, on November 20, 1914. A recent snowfall allowed the men to follow a fresh set of tracks, which ultimately led to the world-record buck. Jim shot the buck with his .25-20 Winchester rifle and later recovered the deer in the middle of the Yellow River. A bizarre chain of events followed the buck after it was left in the hands of local taxidermist, George VanCastle. After several months of waiting to get the mount back, Jim travelled to George’s house in Hinckley, Minnesota, only to find out he had moved. However, unbeknownst to Jim, the mount was still in the attic of George’s house. In 1958, the original Jordan Buck mount showed up at a rummage sale in Sandstone, Minnesota. They were purchased by Bob Ludwig. In 1971, the Jordan Buck was sent to Pennsylvania to be officially scored by a Boone & Crockett judges’ panel. The deer was declared a new world record with a final net typical score of 206 1/8 points. It wasn't until 1978 that James Jordan was finally declared the hunter and Danbury, Wisconsin as the location of the kill. Unfortunately, James Jordan died two months prior to the decision by the Boone & Crockett Club.

The Jordan Buck was the world record typical white-tailed deer for close to 80 years. It was eclipsed for the top world spot in 1993 by a buck taken by Milo Hanson in Saskatchewan. After 100 years, the Jordan Buck remains the highest-scoring typical whitetail ever taken in the United States. The Jordan Buck is one of the most famous bucks in the world due to its enormous set of antlers and bizarre history. The Jordan Buck was part of the original Legendary Whitetails collection owned by Larry Huffman. The original set of antlers were purchased with Huffman's entire collection of Legendary Whitetails by Bass Pro Shops in 2002. The mount now hangs with the King of Bucks Collection in the American National Fish and Wildlife Museum in Springfield, Missouri. Replica mounts of the Jordan Buck exist in several locations throughout the country, including Crex Meadows State Wildlife Area, Legendary Whitetails, Cabela’s and Bass Pro Shops.

== See also ==
- Hole in the Horn Buck
- Boone and Crockett Club
- White-tailed Deer
- Deer hunting
