= Brown Derby (disambiguation) =

Brown Derby was a chain of restaurants in Los Angeles, California.

Brown Derby may also refer to:

- Brown Derby (actor), Scottish actor
- Brown Derby (cocktail)
- Brown Derby (liquor company), the chain of liquor stores
- The Brown Derby (film), a 1926 American silent comedy film
