= Rocky Mountain Elk Foundation =

Conservation and pro-hunting organization in the USA

Registered logo for the Rocky Mountain Elk Foundation

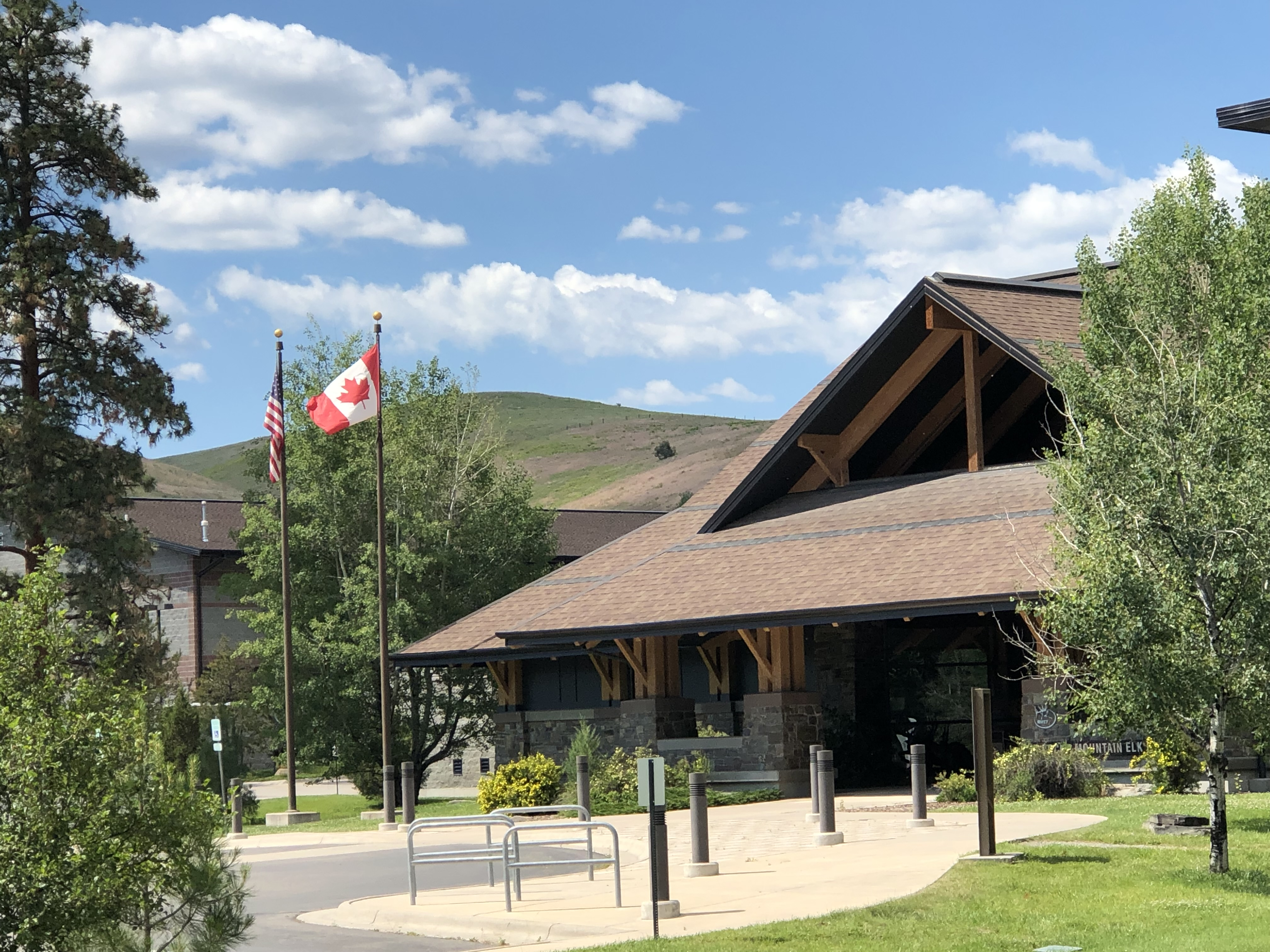
Rocky Mountain Elk Foundation, Missoula, Montana

The Rocky Mountain Elk Foundation (RMEF) is a conservation and pro-hunting organization in the United States.

== History ==
Founded in the United States in 1984 by four hunters from Troy, Montana (Bob Munson, Bill Munson, Dan Bull and Charlie Decker), the mission of the Rocky Mountain Elk Foundation is to ensure the future of elk, other wildlife, their habitat and American hunting heritage. In support of this mission the RMEF is committed to:

1. Conserving, restoring, and enhancing natural habitats;
2. Promoting the sound management of wild, free-ranging elk, which may be hunted or otherwise enjoyed;
3. Fostering cooperation among federal, state, tribal, and private organizations and individuals in wildlife management and habitat conservation; and
4. Educating members and the public about habitat conservation, the value of hunting, hunting ethics, and wildlife management.

Since 1984, the RMEF helped to conserve more than 6.7 million acres (26,700 km^{2}) of habitat. RMEF also helped to restore long-absent elk populations, with herds being reestablished in Kentucky, North Carolina, Ontario, Tennessee, Missouri, Virginia and Wisconsin. RMEF strives to be a strong voice for hunters in access, wildlife management, and conservation policy issues.

The Rocky Mountain Elk Foundation believes that hunting is conservation, that every citizen is entitled to hunt and fish, and that science-based, state-regulated hunting drives wildlife conservation and management.

In September 2020, The Rocky Mountain Elk Foundation and its partners supported $2.6 million in wildlife protection in Colorado.

== Legislation ==
The Rocky Mountain Elk Foundation supported the Bipartisan Sportsmen's Act of 2014 (S. 2363; 113th Congress), which would have exempted lead-based ammunition from regulation under the Toxic Substances Control Act. They urged members to support the bill, saying that it considers the bill "to be of vital importance for conservation, wildlife, and sportsmen and women." The Rocky Mountain Elk Foundation said that they supported the bill because it "protects the use of traditional ammunition, allows more flexibility for federal funds to be used to build and maintain ranges on public lands and ensures access to federal lands for hunting, shooting and other outdoor activities."

== Television Show ==
The Rocky Mountain Elk Foundation produces a television show called, "RMEF Team Elk" hosted by Brandon Bates. The show focuses on elk, elk habitat and elk hunting and features the importance of conservation and hunting heritage.

== See also ==
- Mule Deer Foundation
- Boone and Crockett Club
- Ducks Unlimited
- National Wild Turkey Federation
- Theodore Roosevelt Conservation Partnership
- Union Sportsmen's Alliance
