= Redcat =

Redcat, RedCat or REDCAT may refer to:

- The Roy and Edna Disney CalArts Theater (REDCAT)
- Redcats, a group of fashion and furnishing companies
- RedCat, a Dutch video game series by Davilex Games
- WP:REDCAT, the Wikipedia policy on redirect formatting
