= Northern Tool =

American industrial tools company

- Formerly: Northern Hydraulics (1981-1998)
- Type: Private
- Industry: Industrial tools retail and manufacturing
- Founded: 1981
- Founder: Don Kotula
- Headquarters: Burnsville, Minnesota
- Number of locations: 130 stores (2022)
- Brands: NorthStar, Powerhorse, Klutch, Strongway, Roughneck, Bannon, Ironton, Ultra-Tow, Gravel Gear
- Number of employees: 2,500+ (2022)
- Subsidiaries: Jack's Small Engines
- Website: www.northerntool.com

Northern Tool + Equipment (commonly referred to as Northern Tool) is a manufacturer and retailer of light industrial equipment and do-it-yourself supplies. Founded in 1981 as Northern Hydraulics, the company was officially renamed to Northern Tool + Equipment and is the owner of several private label brands including NorthStar, Powerhorse, Klutch, Strongway, Ultra-Tow, Roughneck, Gravel Gear, Bannon and Ironton which make up a portion of its product line. The company purchased The Golf Warehouse and The Sportsman's Guide in 2012 and sold both in August 2021.

== History ==
Northern Tool was founded by Don Kotula when he began selling log splitters out of his garage. He originally worked in heavy equipment sales at Ziegler, but left when the business began slumping during the 1981-82 recession. In addition to log splitters, Kotula sold cylinders, valves, and hydraulics with his family members assisting in the sales and order fulfillment. The company's first brick and mortar store was opened in Burnsville, Minnesota in 1981. The company also mailed its first catalog in 1981. The company launched its website, northerntool.com in 1999.

Northern Tool began its own manufacturing business in 1991 with the launch of its NorthStar brand. Northern manufactures tools such as log splitters, generators, pressure washers, sprayers, pumps, and air compressors. Northern Tool operates two manufacturing facilities along with four distribution centers. Northern Tool + Equipment's nine private label brands make up 40 percent of sales. The company launched a website and mail order catalogue in 2008 called Kotula's, named after the founder.

== Subsidiaries ==
Northern Tool purchased both The Golf Warehouse and The Sportsman's Guide from Redcats in 2012. The operation of both companies were combined, but operated as standalone online retailers. Both subsidiaries were sold to BHG Ventures in 2021.

== Sponsorship ==
Northern Tool was the sponsor of the NorthernTool.com 250, a NASCAR series race held at the Milwaukee Mile. The race was held in both 1984 and 1985, but then discontinued until 1993 when it resumed through the 2009 season.
