= Wonders of Wildlife Museum & Aquarium =

Wildlife museum

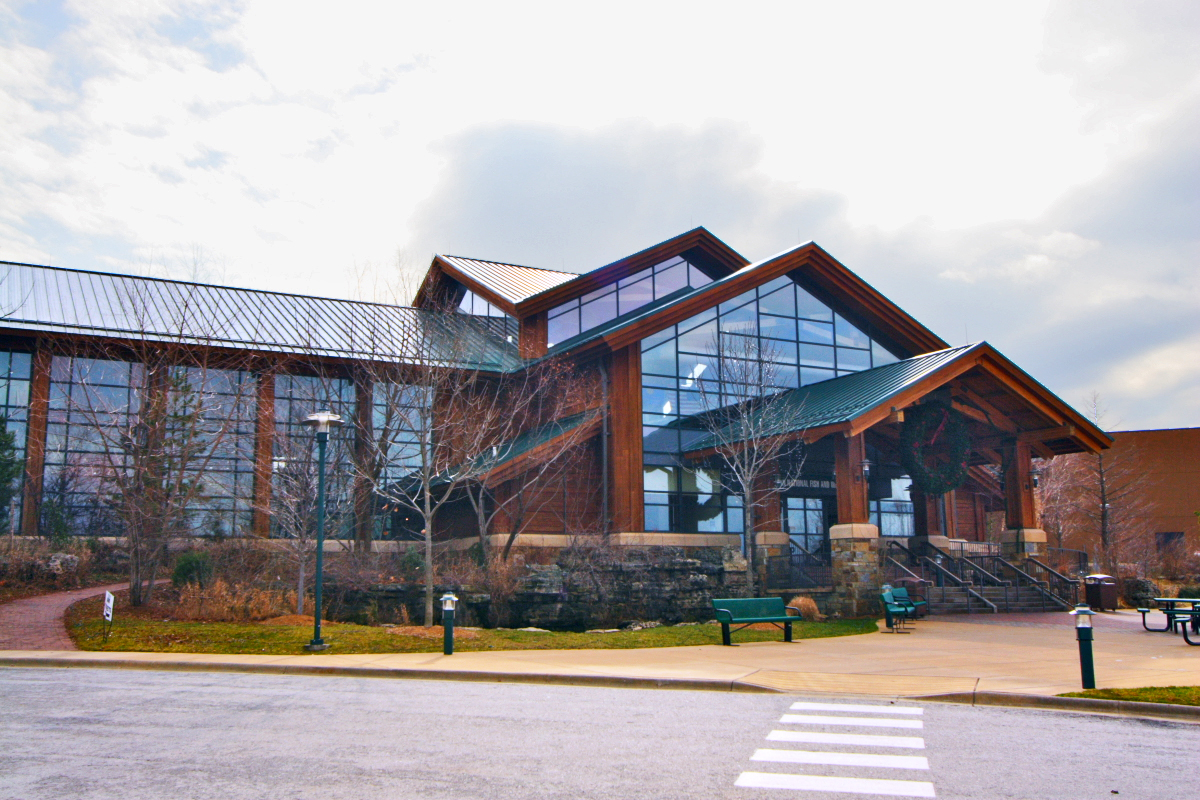
- Interactive map of Wonders of Wildlife Museum & Aquarium
- 37.1814°N 93.2965°W
- Date opened: September 22, 2017
- Location: Springfield, Missouri, United States
- Total volume of tanks: More than 1.5 million US gallons (5,700 m^{3})
- Annual visitors: 1.6 Million (2018)
- Public transit: Springfield Transit Services
- Website: www.wondersofwildlife.org

The Johnny Morris Wonders of Wildlife National Museum and Aquarium, also known as simply Wonders of Wildlife, is a not-for-profit educational conservation-themed attraction in Springfield, Missouri. It is located adjacent and contiguous to the Bass Pro Shops flagship store, and is named for Johnny Morris, the Bass Pro Shops' founder. The 350,000 square foot facility consists of two major sections.

The Wildlife Museum presents a series of immersive wildlife galleries containing taxidermied animals from around the world displayed in elaborate and detailed dioramas representing a variety of natural habitats, as well as historic artifacts, artwork, films, and special exhibits, including the Boone and Crockett Club's North American Heads and Horns Collection of big game mounts.

The 1.5 million gallon (5.7 million liter) Aquarium showcases 35,000 individual fish, amphibians, reptiles, birds and mammals in a series of themed areas including an ocean shipwreck, Louisiana swamp, Ozark forest, and the Amazon rainforest. In a press release accompanying the facility's grand opening announcement Morris was quoted as saying, "Wonders of Wildlife is an inspirational journey around the world that celebrates the role of hunters and anglers as America’s true conservation heroes."

== Inception ==
The initial Wonders of Wildlife museum was the result of an intensive lobbying campaign by and financial support from Johnny Morris. He campaigned for a ballot initiative that funded a portion of the $52 million cost of building the original museum and the creation of a museum district to oversee the planning, design, and construction of the museum. An agreement with the City of Springfield allows a portion of the city's hotel-motel tax to be used for capital projects. This project also received $1.5 million in federal appropriations. However, after receiving public backlash for using public funds on the project, Morris returned the local public money received, and used private funds and donations to finish the project.

== Original Wonders of Wildlife (2001-2007) ==
Wonders of Wildlife's original 92,000-square-foot (8,500 m^{2}) facility, designed by Cambridge Seven Associates opened to the public on November 1, 2001. It housed 225 species of live animals, fresh and saltwater aquariums, interactive displays and educational programs. The original attraction closed in December 2007, with the announcement of a planned expansion that would increase the square footage of the facility by 58 percent, at a cost of $25 million. Subsequently, museum representatives announced a much more ambitious expansion, at a cost of about $80 million. With some changes and updates, the original facility was incorporated into the much larger attraction that opened in September 2017.

== Reopening ==
The facility opened to the public under its current name and configuration on September 22, 2017. In attendance at the opening event were prominent North American conservation leaders and numerous celebrities including U.S. President Jimmy Carter, U.S. President George W. Bush, U.S. Secretary of the Interior Ryan Zinke, Mark Wahlberg, Kevin Costner, Bill Dance, Jimmy Houston, Dale Earnhardt Jr., Tony Stewart, Luke Bryan, Dierks Bentley, Easton Corbin, and many others. More than 40 conservation groups, including the National Audubon Society, Ducks Unlimited, National Wildlife Federation, National Wild Turkey Federation and National Geographic Society, partnered with the Wonders of Wildlife project, which was nearly a decade in development and construction. Wonders of Wildlife was voted the "2017 Best New Attraction" in the United States by readers of USA Today.

== Gallery ==
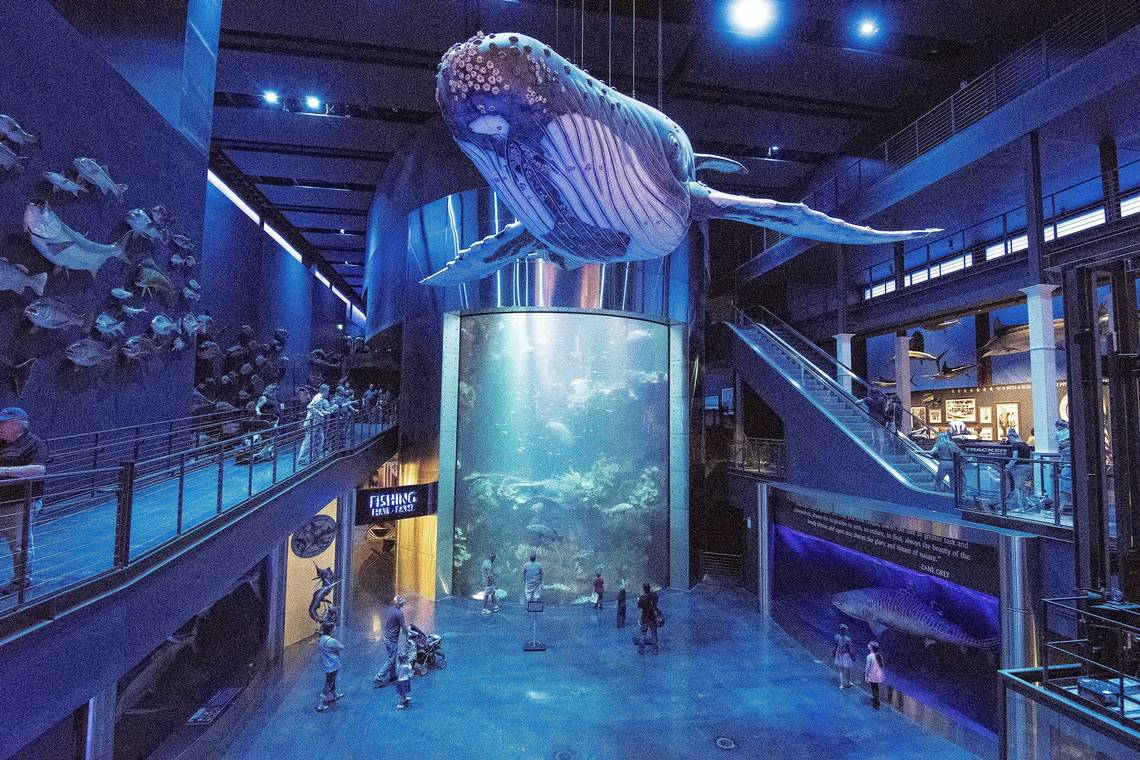
Aquarium entrance hall

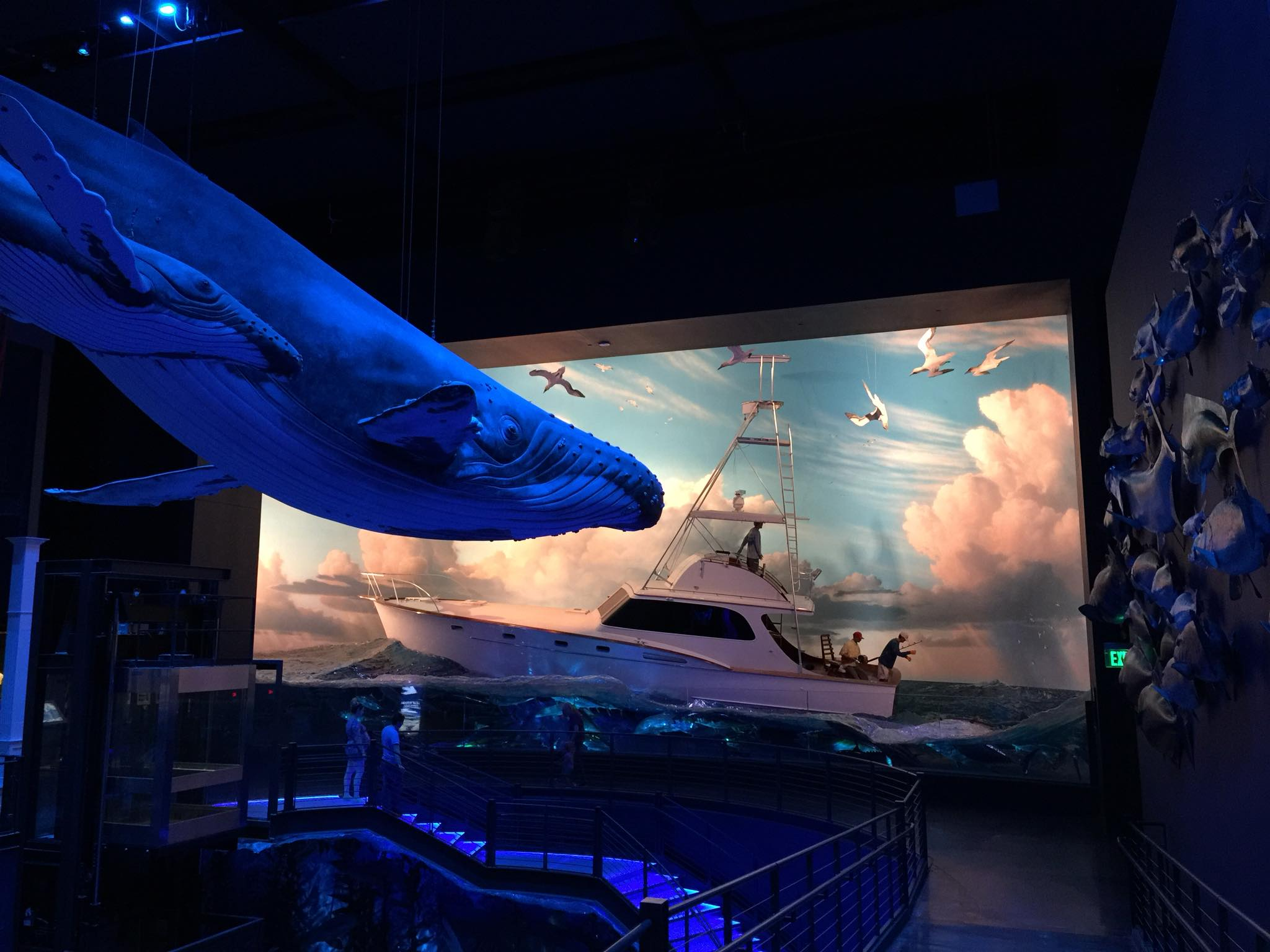
Whale and fishing boat

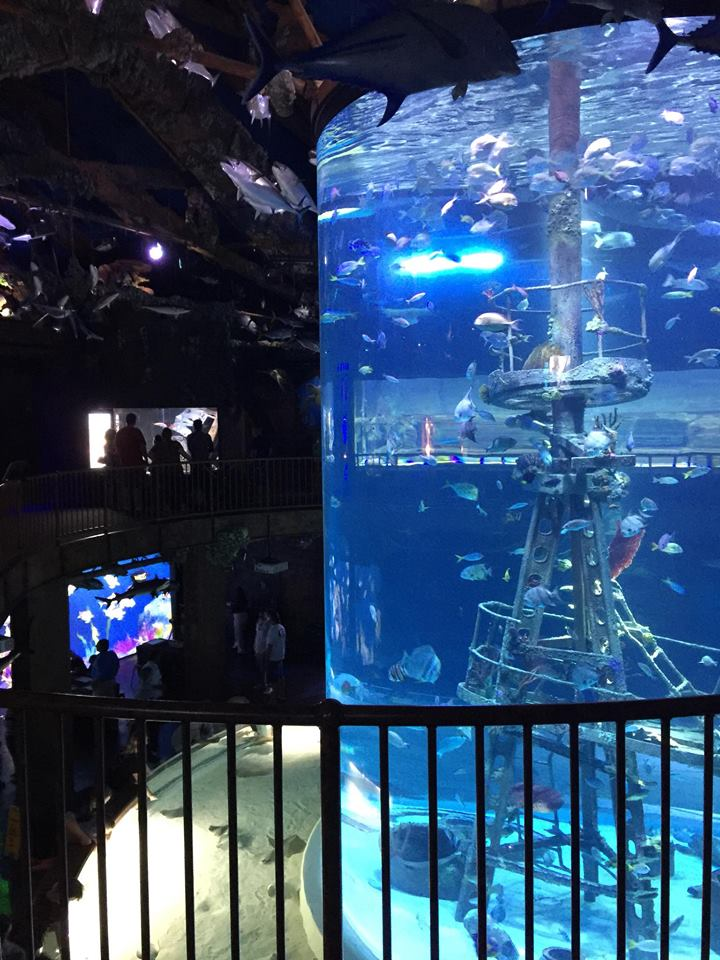
Shipwreck room

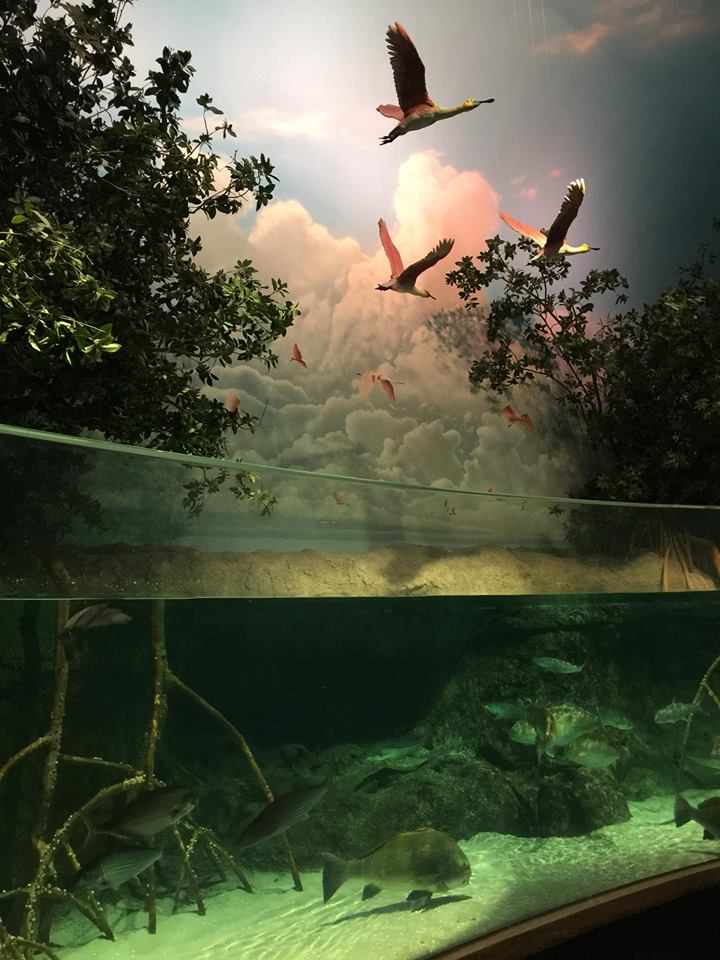
Mangrove swamp display

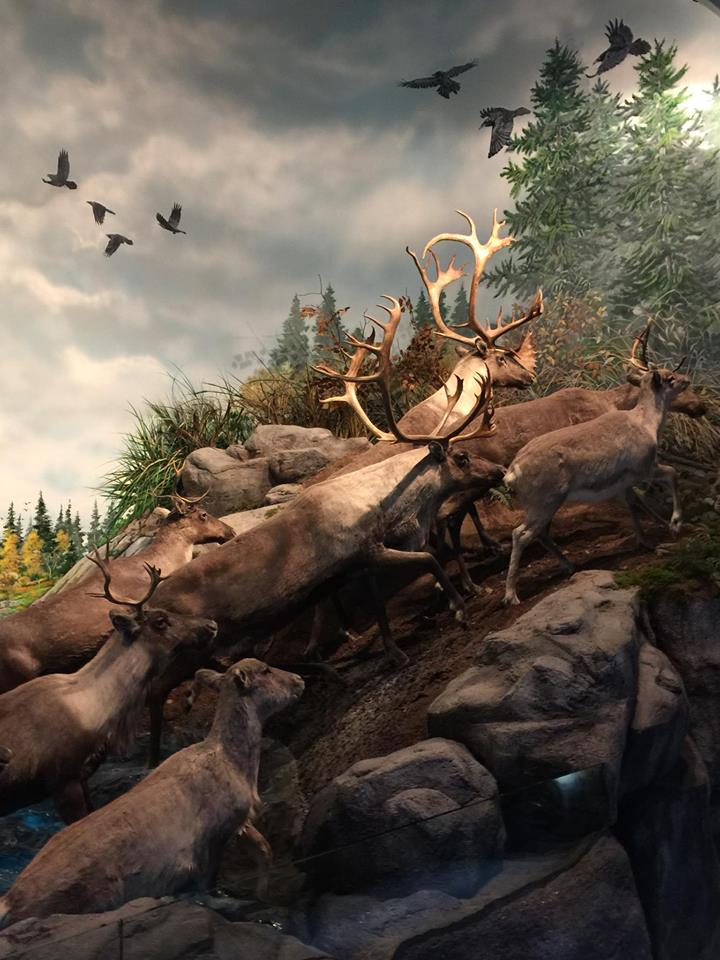
Caribou diorama

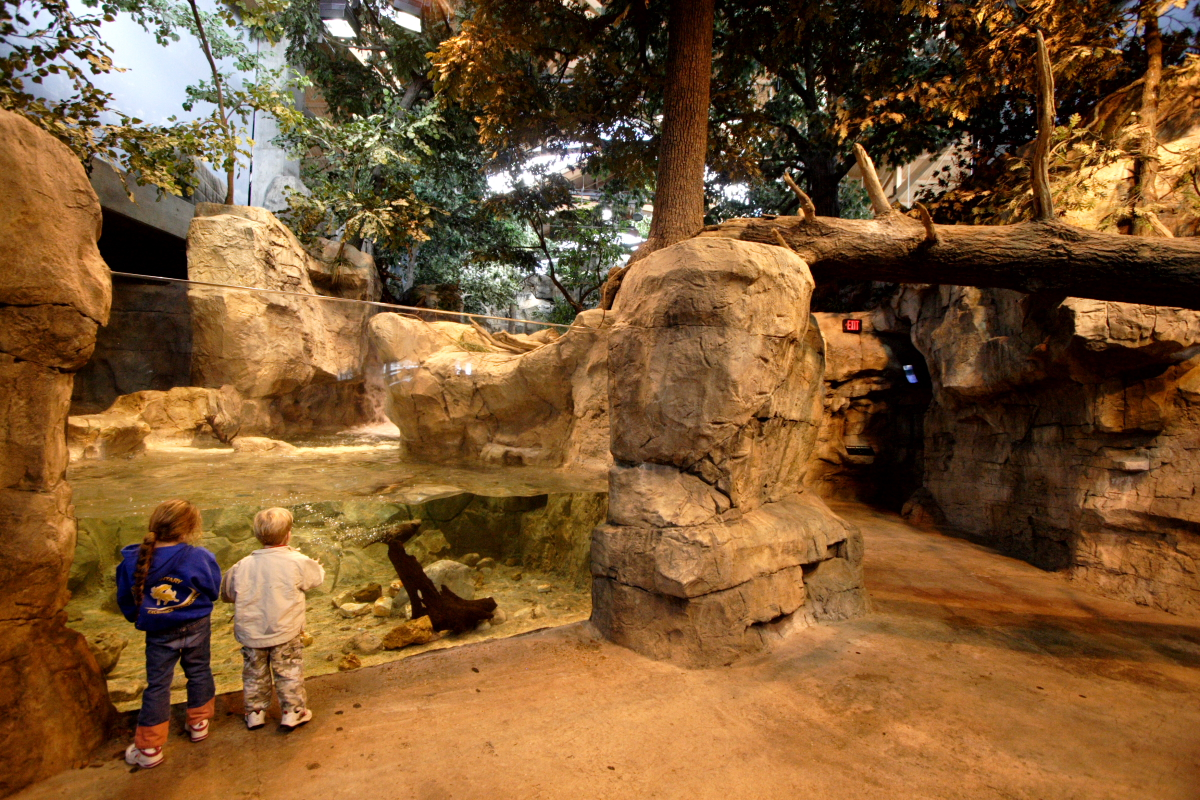
Wonders of Wildlife Museum (interior)
