= Grancel Fitz =

American big-game hunter and photographer (1894–1963)

- Born: 1894; Philadelphia, US
- Died: May 12, 1963 (aged 68); Mount Sinai West, New York City, US
- Occupations: Big-game hunter, photographer

Grancel Fitz (1894 – May 12, 1963) was an American big-game hunter and photographer.

== Biography ==
Fitz was born in 1894, in Philadelphia, to William H. A. Fitz. His first hunts took place in the Susquehanna River Valley area. Having hobbied photography from 1914, he began doing so professionally in 1920. In 1929, he established an advertising photography business after moving to New York City. Active in the 1920s and 1930s, he worked for companies such as AT&T, Chevrolet, Ipana and Ivory and received eight national prizes for his works. He married Betty Sample Haggard by 1924.

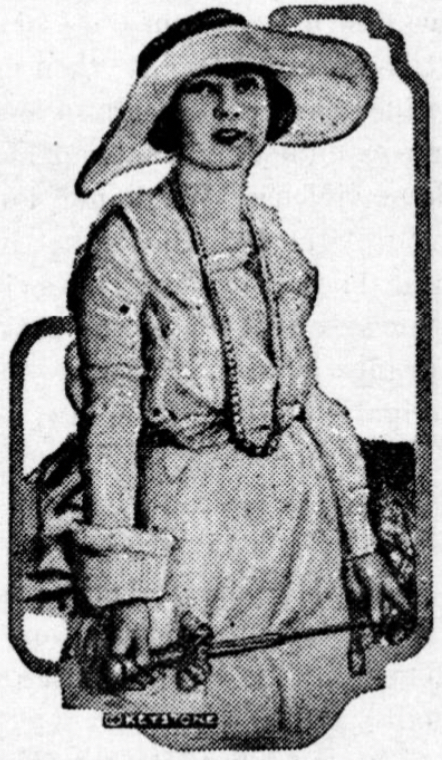
Betty Sample Haggard, Fitz' wife, in a 1924 publication of Der Nordstern

As a big-game hunter, Fitz hunted in places such as Africa and India. Throughout the 1930s and 1940s, he successfully hunted every animal in North America which was listed by the Boone and Crockett Club. He used a Remington Model 30 express chambered in .30-06 and customized by Griffin & Howe He also coined "grand slam" in a big-game hunting context while writing for True in 1950, to describe the collection of every sheep variety listed in North America. In 1953, he tied the world record for the grizzly bear score after killing one near the Klinaklini River. He was also an early influencer of the Boone and Crockett Club's scoring system.

In September 1962, Fitz suffered a myocardial infarction whilst hunting jaguars in Mato Grosso. He died on May 12, 1963, aged 68, of heart disease, at Mount Sinai West in New York City.
