= Paul Stone =

American businessman

- Born: 1969 or 1970 (age 56–57)
- Occupation: Businessman
- Known for: former CEO, Hertz Global Holdings, 2020-21
- Title: CEO, Sportsman's Warehouse

Paul Stone (born 1968/1969) is an American businessman, and the chief executive officer (CEO) of Sportsman's Warehouse since November 2023. He was the president and CE of Hertz Global Holdings from May 2020 to October 2021.

Stone spent 28 years of his career with Walmart as a store manager rising to Western US divisional senior vice president.

In March 2018, Stone joined Hertz as head of its North American car rental operations, after having been the chief retail officer at Cabela's, an outdoors store chain.

In May 2020, Stone was appointed president and CEO of Hertz, with immediate effect, succeeding Kathryn V. Marinello. Three days later the company filed for bankruptcy, but not before paying Stone $700,000.

In November 2023, Stone took the helm of Sportsman's Warehouse, when the recently reduced board named him CEO. His bonus structure includes three stock-issue inducements of over 41,500 shares each May 1 from 2025-2027 contingent upon his continuation in the role.
