= Johnny Morris (businessman) =

American businessman (born 1948)

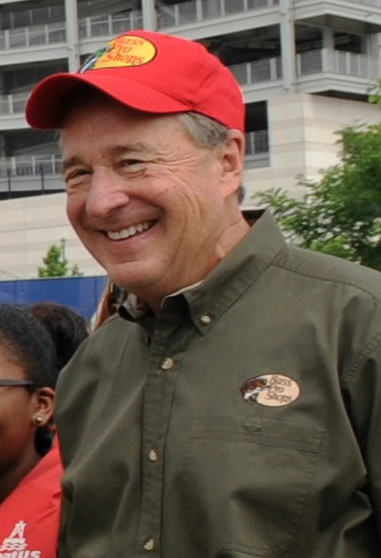
- Morris in 2013
- Born: 1948 (age 77–78); Springfield, Missouri, US
- Education: Drury University
- Occupations: Founder, majority owner, and CEO, Bass Pro Shops
- Spouse: Jeanie
- Children: 4

John L. Morris (born 1948) is an American businessman, conservationist, and the founder of Bass Pro Shops, a hunting and fishing retail chain in the US and Canada, based in Springfield, Missouri. Morris is also the founder of White River Marine Group, Big Cedar Lodge, and Wonders of Wildlife Museum & Aquarium. Through acquisitions, he is now the owner of Cabela's, which united with Bass Pro Shops in 2017.

== Early life ==
John Morris was born in Springfield, Missouri, in 1948. Morris was educated at Drury University. His father was a World War II veteran. He states that both of his parents were hunters and fishers, which shaped his life growing up in the Ozarks and began the start of his passion for the sports. Morris graduated from Glendale High School, then enrolled at Drury University to major in business. He often jokes that he "majored in fishing" during college.

== Career ==
Prior to 1972, the Morris family was involved in a variety of successful businesses in the Springfield area, including Morris Equipment (laundry) and Brown Derby (liquor). They were both founded by John A. Morris, the father of John L. Morris.

John L. Morris founded Bass Pro Shops in 1972 when he began selling fishing equipment in the back of one of his father's Brown Derby liquor stores in Springfield.

In 1987, after a growth of Bass Pro Shops, Morris purchased a property previously owned and developed by business entrepreneur Jude Simmons and Frisco Railroad executive Harry Worman. The property was then sold to a real estate executive Dan Norris who developed the lands and the two buildings left by Simmons and Worman, now known as the historic Worman House and Devil's Pool Bar and Restaurant on the property. Dan Norris later sold it to John Morris for an undisclosed amount and the property, currently named Big Cedar Lodge, has been expanded to about 4,600 acres and was touted as the "#1 Resort in the Midwest" by Travel + Leisure magazine. Big Cedar Lodge was also home to the inaugural Internet Invitational in 2025. Morris made a speech at the beginning of the event.

Morris opened the Wonders of Wildlife Museum & Aquarium in Springfield in 2017. The museum helps bring visitors to the Bass Pro store with which it shares a location. In September 2017, Bass Pro acquired Cabela's, another retailer of outdoor merchandise, for $4 billion.

Morris and his family were presented with the Audubon Medal in February 2019, in recognition of their conservation efforts. The Golf Course Superintendents Association of America awarded Morris its highest honor, the Old Tom Morris Award, in 2023 for his continuing lifetime commitment to the sport of golf and conservation efforts.

Morris also founded the Top of the Rock golf course in Ridgedale, Missouri, which houses one of the largest collections of Native American arrowheads and art in the region. Top of the Rock experienced a 70-foot-wide sinkhole on May 22, 2016.

Since 2022, Morris has been the owner of the Missouri Thunder; one of ten bull riding teams in the Professional Bull Riders (PBR) Team Series, which runs every summer and autumn in the United States. In 2026, the Missouri Thunder won the inaugural Monster Energy Team Challenge Championship.

== Political activity ==
Morris contributed $200,000 to Donald Trump's 2020 presidential campaign. He has been making consistent investments to Republican committees and candidates dating back to 1992. He made significant investments to political action committees for Republicans in US congress.

== Personal life ==
He is married, with four children, and lives in Springfield, Missouri.
