= Brown Derby (liquor company) =

Liquor store chain in Springfield, Missouri, United States

The Brown Derby is a chain of liquor stores located in and around Springfield, Missouri. The first Brown Derby was opened in Springfield in 1937 by John A. Morris. The Brown Derby is famous for being the first retail location for fishing lures and other fishing accessories sold by John L. Morris, the son of the Brown Derby's founder, and the future proprietor of the Springfield-based Bass Pro Shops. John L. Morris began selling fishing and other outdoor products from an 8×8 ft (2.4×2.4 m) section of his father's store and eventually incorporated Bass Pro Shops in 1972.

== History ==
The first Brown Derby was opened in 1937 by John A. Morris, the father of John L. Morris, the creator and owner of the outdoor retail store chain Bass Pro Shop. The Brown Derby has grown to 18 locations in and around Springfield, Missouri, including the Brown Derby International Wine Center.

== International Wine Center ==
The Brown Derby International Wine Center was opened in 1969.
