= Legendary Whitetails =

United States clothing company

- Company type: Private
- Industry: Retail
- Founded: 1999
- Founder: Larry Huffman
- Headquarters: Apopka, Florida, U.S.
- Products: Everyday Apparel for Hunters: clothing, gift/home, footwear, camouflage, outdoor gear
- Website: legendarywhitetails.com

Legendary Whitetails is a clothing company that designs and sells everyday apparel, gifts, and gear related to deer hunting. Legendary Whitetails was established in 1999 as a direct-to-consumer catalog and internet retailer, and is headquartered in Apopka, Florida.

== History ==
Legendary Whitetails was founded in 1999 by Larry Huffman, a hunter and conservationist.

Founder Larry Huffman died in 2007.

In 2019, the company filed for Chapter 128 Receivership in Washington County Circuit Court on March 4. The company was sold and operations moved to Florida in May 2019. It is now owned and operated by Entertainment Retail Enterprises, a wholesale company that manufactures for companies like Disney, Walmart and others.

== Products ==
The Legendary Whitetails brand was established with the release of the 1999 catalog, deeming product as the “Original Deer Gear”. The catalog, along with the ecommerce website are the primary channels of business. The product line included a men's line, women's line, kids’ apparel, Big and Tall sizing, footwear, home, hunting, and auto product categories.

The Hunt Bum apparel line was added in 2013 and was designed specifically for active outdoorsmen.

As of 2014, the women's line was the fastest growing segment of Legendary Whitetails.

== Achievements ==
In 2013, Legendary Whitetails won the Outstanding Employer Award, given by the Wisconsin Rehabilitation Association's Job Placement and Development Board.

== See also ==
- Academy Sports + Outdoors
- Bass Pro Shops
- Cabela's
- Dick's Sporting Goods
- REI
- Scheels
- The Sportsman's Guide
- Sportsman's Warehouse
- Lands' End
- List of Florida companies
