= Boone and Crockett Club =

Non-profit organisation in the USA

- Formation: December 21, 1887; 138 years ago
- Founders: Theodore Roosevelt, George Bird Grinnell
- Type: 501(c)(3) nonprofit advocacy organization
- Headquarters: Missoula, Montana, US
- Website: boone-crockett.org

The Boone and Crockett Club is an American nonprofit organization that advocates fair chase hunting in support of habitat conservation. The club is North America's oldest wildlife and habitat conservation organization, founded in the United States in 1887 by Theodore Roosevelt and George Bird Grinnell. The club was named in honor of hunter-heroes of the day, Daniel Boone and Davy Crockett, whom the club's founders viewed as pioneering men who hunted extensively while opening the American frontier, but realized the consequences of overharvesting game. In addition to authoring a famous "fair chase" statement of hunter ethics, the club worked for the expansion and protection of Yellowstone National Park and the establishment of American conservation in general. The club and its members were also responsible for the elimination of commercial market hunting, creation of the National Park and National Forest Services, National Wildlife Refuge system, wildlife reserves, and funding for conservation, all under the umbrella of what is known today as the North American Model of Wildlife Conservation.

The club is headquartered in Missoula, Montana, which is also the home of the Rocky Mountain Elk Foundation.

== Background ==
Key members of the club have included Theodore Roosevelt, George Bird Grinnell, Madison Grant, Charles Alexander Sheldon, William Tecumseh Sherman, Boies Penrose, Gifford Pinchot, Frederick Russell Burnham, Charles Deering and Aldo Leopold.

The club continues its role as a think-tank, known to the public primarily for maintaining a scoring and data collection system by which native North American big game animals are measured and tracked as a gauge of successful wildlife management.

The structure of the club consists of 17 staff members, 100 Regular Members, 159 Professional Members, and thousands of Club Associates.

== Club history ==
In December, 1887, Theodore Roosevelt proposed the formation of the Boone and Crockett Club at a dinner at his residence in New York City. In January, 1888, the club was organized with the following officers and members:

- President: Theodore Roosevelt
- Secretary: Archibald Rogers
- Members: Albert Bierstadt, Heber R. Bishop, Benjamin F. Bristow, J. Coleman Drayton, D.G. Elliott, George Bird Grinnell, Arnold Hague, James E. Jones, Clarence King, Wm. H. Merrill Jr, Thomas Paton, John J. Pierrepont, W. Hallett Phillips, E. P. Rogers, Elliott Roosevelt, J.E. Roosevelt, J. W. Roosevelt, Rutherfurd Stuyvesant, W. A. Wadsworth, Bronson Rumsey, Lawrence Rumsey and W.D. Pickett.

The Club set out with the goals of promoting skill with hunting firearms, exploring the wilderness of the United States, preservation of native big game animals, observing and recording wildlife, and engaging in discourse about opinions and ideas pertaining to exploration, hunting, and travel.

== Education ==
The Boone and Crockett Club offers many educational camps and workshops through the Boone and Crockett Club Education Programs held at the Theodore Roosevelt Memorial Ranch in Dupuyer, Montana. These education programs at the TRM Ranch are not federally funded. They are supported by the Boone and Crockett Club and by private foundations committed to K–12 education.

The club's Lee and Penny Anderson Conservation Education Program is located on the club's 6,060-acre working cattle ranch, the Theodore Roosevelt Memorial Ranch (TRMR) and bases out of their 5,000-square-foot Rasmuson Wildlife Conservation Center (RWCC). RWCC's typical operating season is from April 1 to October 31. A variety of educational programs are offered during this time, including but not limited to: K–12 Conservation Education-related field trips, the Boone and Crockett Club's own Outdoor Adventure Camps (five-day residential camps for middle school- and high school-aged youth), a nationally accredited Boy Scouts of America High Adventure Camp called MOHAB (Montana High Adventure Base), a series of hunter education courses, shooting sports events and is available for rental to public, private, NGO, agency and other groups.

== See also ==
- Grancel Fitz
- James Jordan Buck
- Hole in the Horn Buck
