= Brown Derby (cocktail) =

Bourbon cocktail

The Brown Derby, originally called the "De Rigueur" in cocktail books, is a three-ingredient cocktail that was named after the Brown Derby hat-shaped Los Angeles diner. It consists of bourbon, grapefruit juice, and honey syrup. The cocktail was created at The Hollywood Reporter founder Billy Wilkerson's Vendôme Club on Sunset Boulevard in 1930.

The Brown Derby is considered a brunch cocktail in that it is "tart enough to wake up the palate, but not tangy enough to jolt". It has also been described as "an edgy riff on a Daiquiri" and "wholly unlike most popular whiskey cocktails in that it comes across as light and fresh." One advantage of the Brown Derby is that its ingredients are easy to find; it does not, for example, require any obscure liqueurs. It has been noted that the honey in the Brown Derby is able to "bridge the gap between bourbon's sweet, earthy, caramel flavors, and grapefruit's acidic, floral tang."

Some variants include herbs such as rosemary or sage or substitute rye whiskey for bourbon.
