= Academy Sports + Outdoors =

American sporting goods store chain

Academy Sports and Outdoors, Inc.

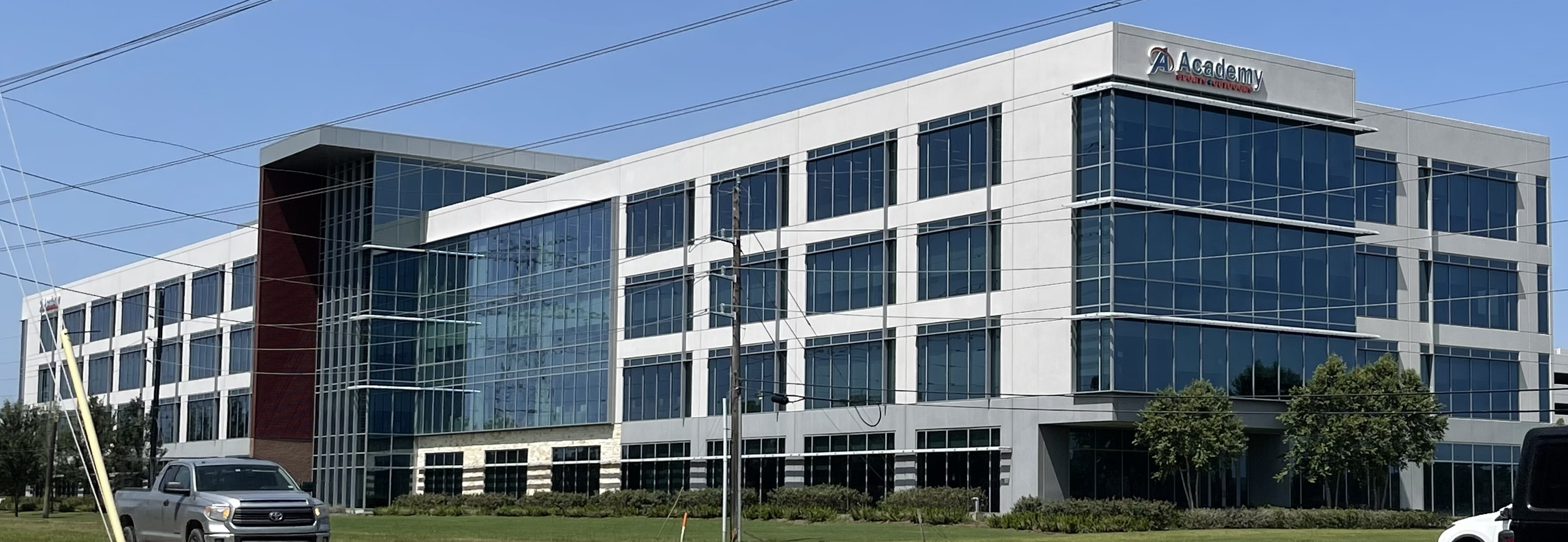
- Academy's headquarters near Katy, Texas.
- Type: Public
- Traded as: Nasdaq: ASO; S&P 600 component
- Industry: Retail
- Founded: 1938; 88 years ago in San Antonio, Texas, U.S.
- Headquarters: Unincorporated Harris County (near Katy, Texas, U.S.)
- Number of locations: 339 (2026)
- Areas served: Alabama, Arkansas, Florida, Georgia, Illinois, Indiana, Kansas, Kentucky, Louisiana, Maryland, Mississippi, Missouri, North Carolina, Ohio, Oklahoma, Pennsylvania, South Carolina, Tennessee, Texas, Virginia and West Virginia
- Key people: Max & Arthur Gochman, founders
- Products: Sports equipment
- Revenue: ▲US$6.05 billion (2026)
- Net income: ▼US$377 million (2026)
- Number of employees: 22,000 (2023)
- Website: academy.com

Academy Sports + Outdoors is an American sporting-goods store chain with corporate offices in the Katy Distribution Center in unincorporated western Harris County, Texas, United States, near Katy and west of Houston. For 74 years, it was a privately held company owned by the Gochman family, until its May 2011 acquisition by Kohlberg Kravis Roberts. In October 2020, it was listed on NASDAQ.

== History ==
The origin of Academy Sports + Outdoors dates back to 1938, when Max Gochman opened the Academy Tire Shop in San Antonio, Texas, across the street from St. Henry's Academy, a now defunct Catholic high school. After a few years, Gochman began selling military surplus in his shop, and used the name for new branch stores in the Austin area.

=== 1970s-1980s ===
In 1970, Max's son, Arthur Gochman, bought a chain of six military surplus stores in Houston. At the time, Gochman was a practicing attorney in San Antonio. He had not been formally educated as a businessman, but he had learned much about the surplus retail business from his father. Gochman bought out his partner in 1973 and changed the company's business name from Southern Sales to Academy Corp. Because many University of Texas students and graduates lived in the Houston area and were familiar with the Austin stores, Max Gochman permitted his son to use the name, knowing that it would help his son's business. In 1978, the younger Gochman relinquished his law practice and relocated to Houston to assume active control of the company and implement a comprehensive overhaul of its core merchandising policies.

Academy built new offices and a 50,000-sq-ft warehouse in 1981. The chain grew from eight stores in 1980 to 12 in 1985.

By the end of the 1980s, Academy had become a popular Texas chain. Among other things, its outlets sold more state fishing licenses than its chief competitor, Oshman's Sporting Goods, or any other group of stores.

=== 1990s ===
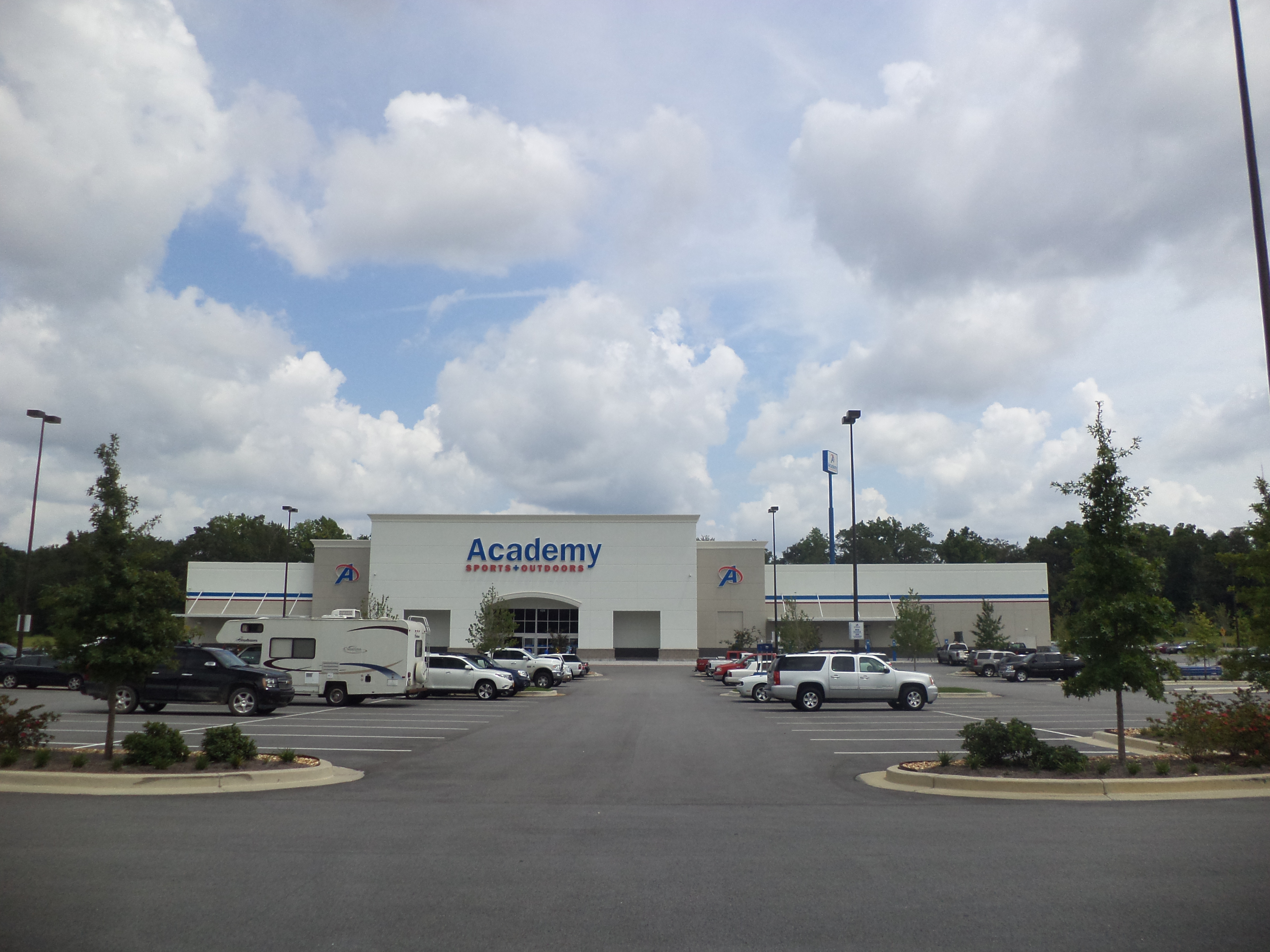
Academy Sports + Outdoors, Valdosta, Georgia

By 1990, Academy had grown to 18 stores. At that time, it was selling more cowboy boots than any other chain in the United States. It also began a period of more rapid expansion, jumping to 34 stores by 1995, the year after it first moved into two adjoining states. It opened its first store outside Texas in Edmond, Oklahoma, in June 1994, then added a store in Lafayette, Louisiana, the following November, thus ending the company's exclusive Texas identity. In 1997, Arthur's son, David Gochman, became CEO.

Academy's roots remain in Texas, though, and the epicenter of the company's business has always been the greater Houston area. Almost half of its stores are located there, along with the company's headquarters and distribution facility. As it has expanded beyond its home base, Academy has sought "hot-market" locales, places that from market analysis offered the promise of high-volume sales. The result has been that it has never had to close one of its new stores, all of which have been profitable since their opening day.

David Gochman, the founder's son and a graduate of Harvard in Chinese studies and the University of Texas Law School, joined Academy in 1995 on a full-time basis. By that time, his father, then 65, had built Academy into a $350 million retail chain and was ready to hand over control of the business to his 30-year-old son. David Gochman initially served as vice-president of store operations and general counsel, but in the following year, he succeeded his father as Academy's chairman, president, and CEO.

In 1996, Academy expanded into Alabama. In 1998, it opened its first Florida location. In 1999, it expanded in Mississippi and Tennessee.

=== 2000s ===
In 2000, Academy opened its 50th location in Temple, Texas, then expanded into Arkansas in 2003 and Missouri and Georgia in 2005. In 2006, the company opened its first 100,000-sq-ft store. Rodney Faldyn became president of Academy in 2007, and at that time, the company expanded into South Carolina. In 2009, Academy opened a second distribution warehouse in Twiggs County, Georgia.

=== 2010s and acquisition by KKR ===
In 2011, Academy Sports + Outdoors was acquired by Kohlberg Kravis Roberts (KKR). Just months after acquisition, the brand launched an e-commerce store and became a multichannel retailer. At that time, Faldyn became CEO and president. In 2012, Academy expanded into North Carolina and Kansas. In 2014, it expanded into Indiana and Kentucky. In 2015, J.K. Symancyk became CEO and president. At that time, Academy opened its 200th store in Tupelo, Mississippi. In 2016, Academy expanded into Illinois and opened a third distribution warehouse in Cookeville, Tennessee. In 2018, the company opened its 250th store in Mansfield, Texas.

=== IPO, 2020s and further growth ===
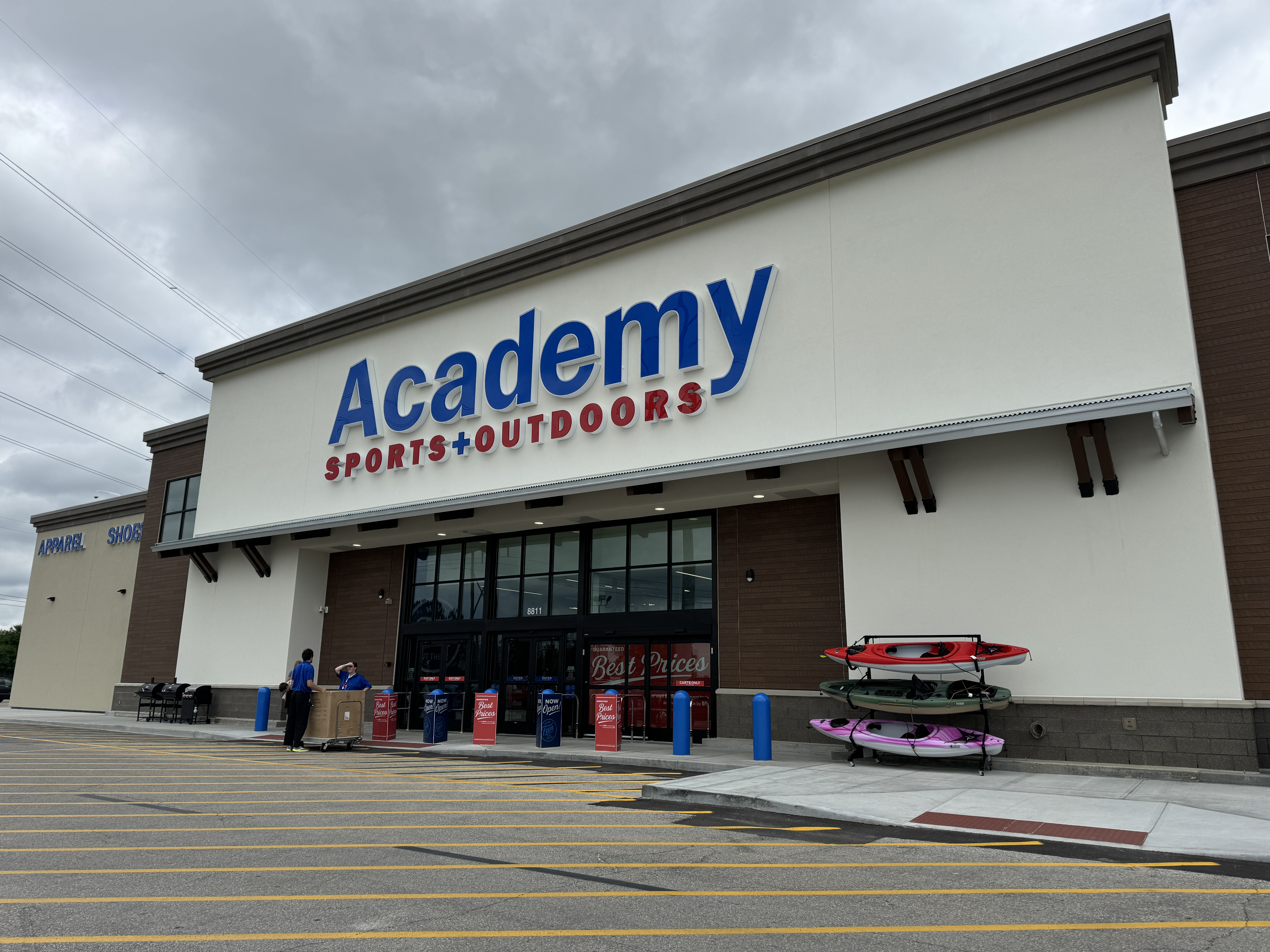
Academy Sports + Outdoors in Indianapolis, Indiana. The store opened in 2024.

On October 2020, Academy launched an initial public offering and became a public company listed on the Nasdaq with the ticker symbol ASO. After going public, a continued national expansion plan was laid out calling for 8-10 stores per year starting in 2022. Shares originally stood below $13, but eventually rose to $40 by June 2021. After its first public year, Academy debuted on the Fortune 500 list of 2021. In 2022, Academy Sports + Outdoors opened its first locations in Virginia and West Virginia. It opened its first Ohio location in Zanesville in 2024, and announced plans to open 160-180 locations over the next five years. In 2025, Academy opened its first locations in Maryland and Pennsylvania. In March 2026, it opened a location at The Strip in Canton, Ohio.

== Sponsorships ==
Academy owns the naming rights to the Bassmaster Classic (officially referred to the Academy Sports + Outdoors Bassmaster Classic).

It is also the official sporting retailer of the NCAA Southeastern Conference, Southwestern Athletic Conference, Central Intercollegiate Athletic Association, and the Southern Intercollegiate Athletic Conference. The Houston Astros and the Indianapolis Colts also hold strong partnerships with the store.

== See also ==
- Bass Pro Shops
- Cabela's
- Dick's Sporting Goods
- Legendary Whitetails
- Scheels
- Sportsman's Warehouse
- List of Texas companies
