= Scheels =

U.S. sporting goods chain store

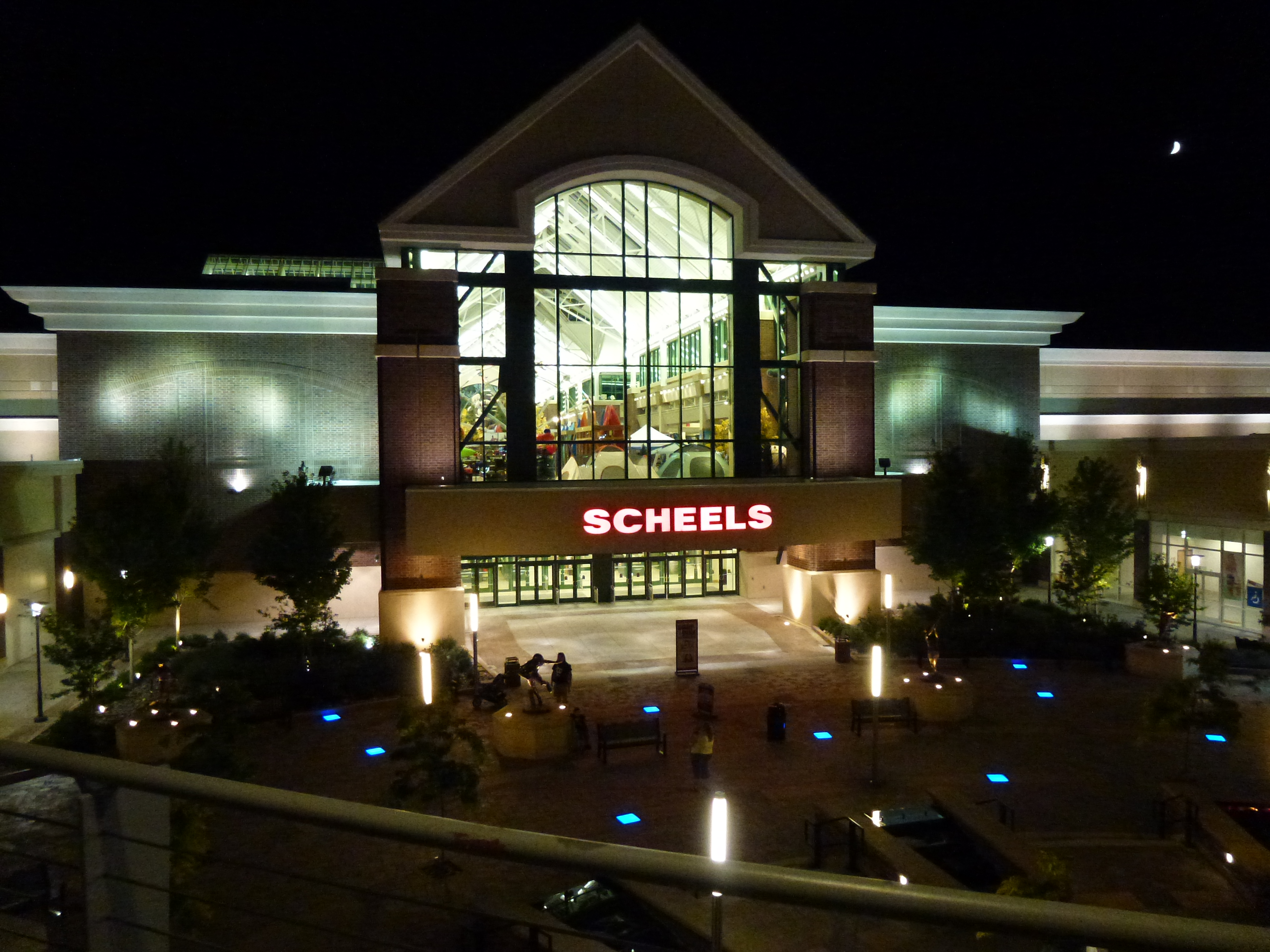
- Scheels in Sparks, Nevada
- Type: Private
- Industry: Retail
- Founded: 1902; 124 years ago in Sabin, Minnesota, United States
- Founders: Frederick A. Scheel
- Headquarters: Fargo, North Dakota, United States
- Number of locations: 34 (2024)
- Area served: Arizona, Colorado, Idaho, Illinois, Iowa, Kansas, Minnesota, Montana, Nebraska, Nevada, North Dakota, South Dakota, Texas, Utah, Oklahoma and Wisconsin
- Key people: Matt Hanson (CEO)
- Products: Apparel, sports equipment, shoes, exercise equipment
- Services: Sporting goods
- Number of employees: 11,000 (2024)
- Website: scheels.com

Scheels (/ˈʃiːlz/) is an American privately held, employee-owned and operated sporting goods and entertainment chain store headquartered in Fargo, North Dakota. Scheels operates thirty-four store locations in sixteen U.S. states.

== Company Overview ==
The headquarters are located in Fargo, North Dakota, along with two stores, one traditional all-sports store, and a store focusing on home and hardware that is in the old sports store after being in its University Drive location since 1962.

Scheels began as a hardware and general merchandise store in Sabin, Minnesota, in 1902. Frederick A. Scheel, a German immigrant, used the $300 he earned from his first harvest of potatoes as the down payment on the first Scheels store. In May 2026, Scheels announced that the company's last hardware store would close at the end of the year.

Scheels started adding a small selection of sporting goods to its stores in 1954. Over the years, Scheels opened in surrounding communities including Fargo, North Dakota, which became the corporate headquarters. Scheels' first all-sports superstore opened in Grand Forks, North Dakota, in 1989. This store relocated to Columbia Mall in 2014.

CEO Steve M. Scheel, great-grandson of Frederick A. Scheel, oversees the company of over 11,000 associates. His father, Steve D. Scheel, is the chairman of the board.

== Locations ==
Scheels owns and operates thirty-four stores in sixteen U.S. states, mostly located in the Midwest. There are five stores in North Dakota, two of which are in Fargo. There are also locations in Bismarck, Grand Forks, and Minot.

There are five stores in Minnesota, which are located in Eden Prairie, Mankato, Moorhead, St. Cloud, and Rochester. South Dakota has two stores in Sioux Falls and Rapid City. Iowa has four stores, which are located in Cedar Falls, Coralville, Sioux City, and West Des Moines. Illinois has one store, which can be found in Springfield. Nebraska, has two locations in Lincoln and Omaha. Wisconsin has two locations in Eau Claire and Appleton. Kansas has two locations in Wichita and Overland Park. The company opened its newest location on October 19, 2024, in Tulsa, Oklahoma.

On December 3, 2012, Scheels announced that it would be opening the company's new flagship store in Overland Park, Kansas, in the Corbin Park outdoor retail village. The store would be a 222,000 square feet (20,600 m^{2}), two-story building. CEO Steve Scheel said that he had grand plans for the interior of the store. Customers will enter the store under a 16,000-gallon aquarium, complete with a coral reef and scuba divers to feed the fish daily. A 65-foot (20 m), 16-car Ferris wheel also will be in the store, in addition to sport simulators and a walk of U.S. presidents. Scheels opened its new flagship store in Overland Park, Kansas, on June 27, 2015.

On July 11, 2020, Scheels opened a two-story, 250,000 square feet (23,000 m^{2}) store at the Eden Prairie Center in Eden Prairie, MN.

Outside of the Midwest, Montana has three Scheels locations in Billings, Missoula, and Great Falls. Utah has a location in Sandy. Colorado has two locations in Johnstown and Colorado Springs. In 2029, a third Colorado location will open in Littleton. Nevada has one location in Sparks. Idaho has one store in Meridian.

In May 2020, the Scheels opened a location in Texas, located in The Colony. At 331,000 square feet (30,800 m^{2}), this store is the largest Scheels and largest all-sports store in the world. The company is set to open a second Texas location in Cedar Park on August 29, 2026.

On May 19, 2020, Macerich announced that Scheels will open its first Arizona location at Chandler Fashion Center in the fall of 2023, replacing a vacant Nordstrom.

== Scheels Outfitters brand ==
Scheels Outfitters is a premium brand exclusive to Scheels. Merchandise is designed for field experts by "Scheels Experts." This includes gear for fishing, hunting, and shooting.

== See also ==
- Academy Sports + Outdoors
- Bass Pro Shops
- Cabela's
- Dick's Sporting Goods
- Legendary Whitetails
- Sportsman's Warehouse
- List of North Dakota companies
