= Bass Pro Shops =

American outdoor retailer

BPS Direct, LLC

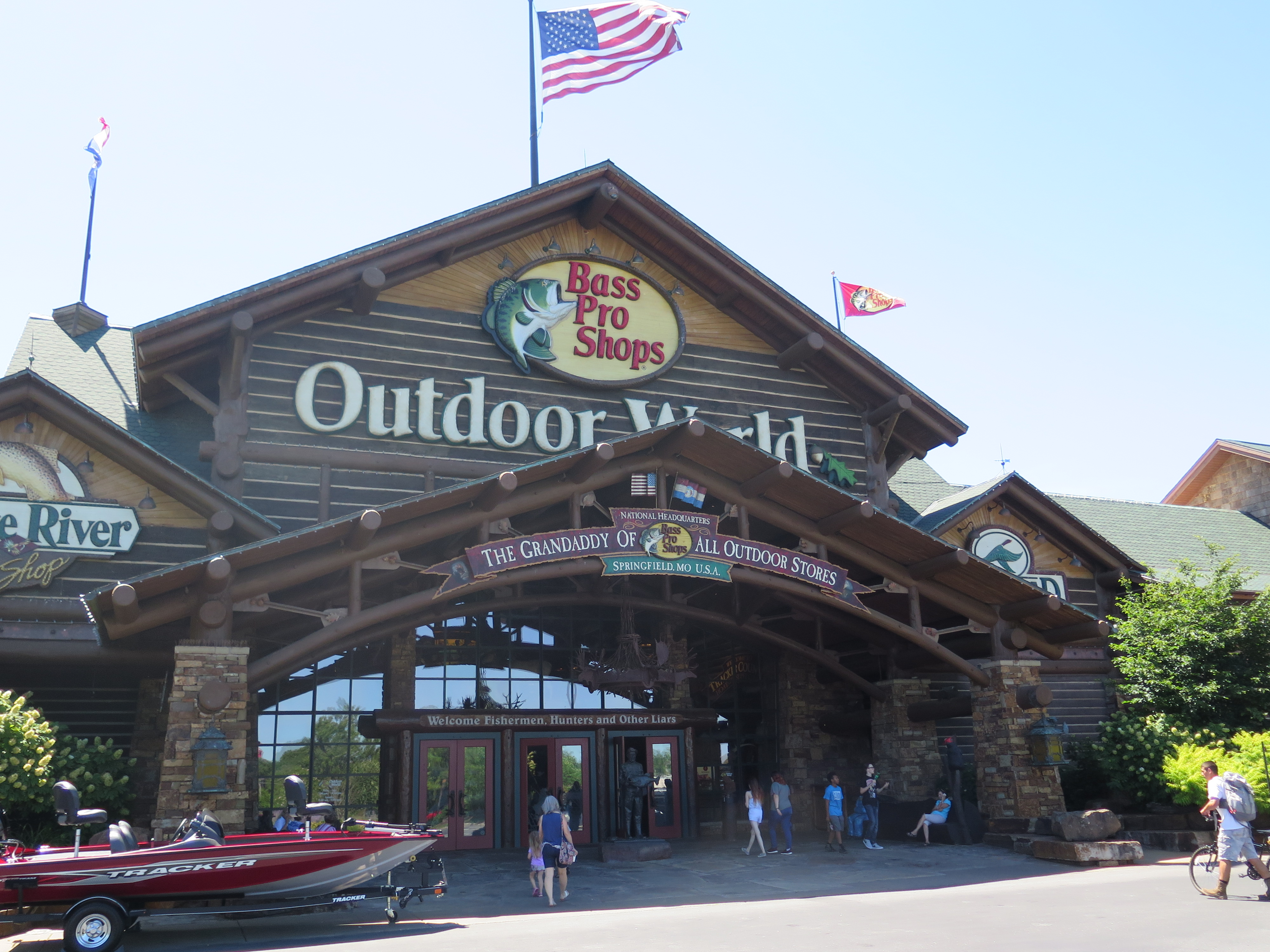
- Headquarters and flagship store in Springfield, Missouri
- Trade name: Bass Pro Shops
- Type: Private
- Industry: Retail
- Founded: 1972; 54 years ago
- Founder: Johnny Morris
- Headquarters: Springfield, Missouri
- Number of locations: 181
- Key people: Johnny Morris (Founder)
- Products: Hunting, fishing, and outdoor merchandise
- Revenue: ▲US$6.5 billion (2023)
- Number of employees: 40,000
- Subsidiaries: Cabela's; White River Marine Group (through Cabela's)
- Website: www.basspro.com

BPS Direct, LLC, doing business as Bass Pro Shops, is an American privately held sporting goods retailer that offers hunting, fishing, camping, and other related outdoor recreation equipment, marine manufacturing and sales, and outdoor resorts. The stores feature natural outdoor designs and decorations. Bass Pro Shops support conservation efforts, organizations that support the United States Armed Services and Veterans, and outdoor education and recreation for youth. The company's headquarters, original store, and the Wonders of Wildlife National Museum & Aquarium are located in Springfield, Missouri.

== History ==
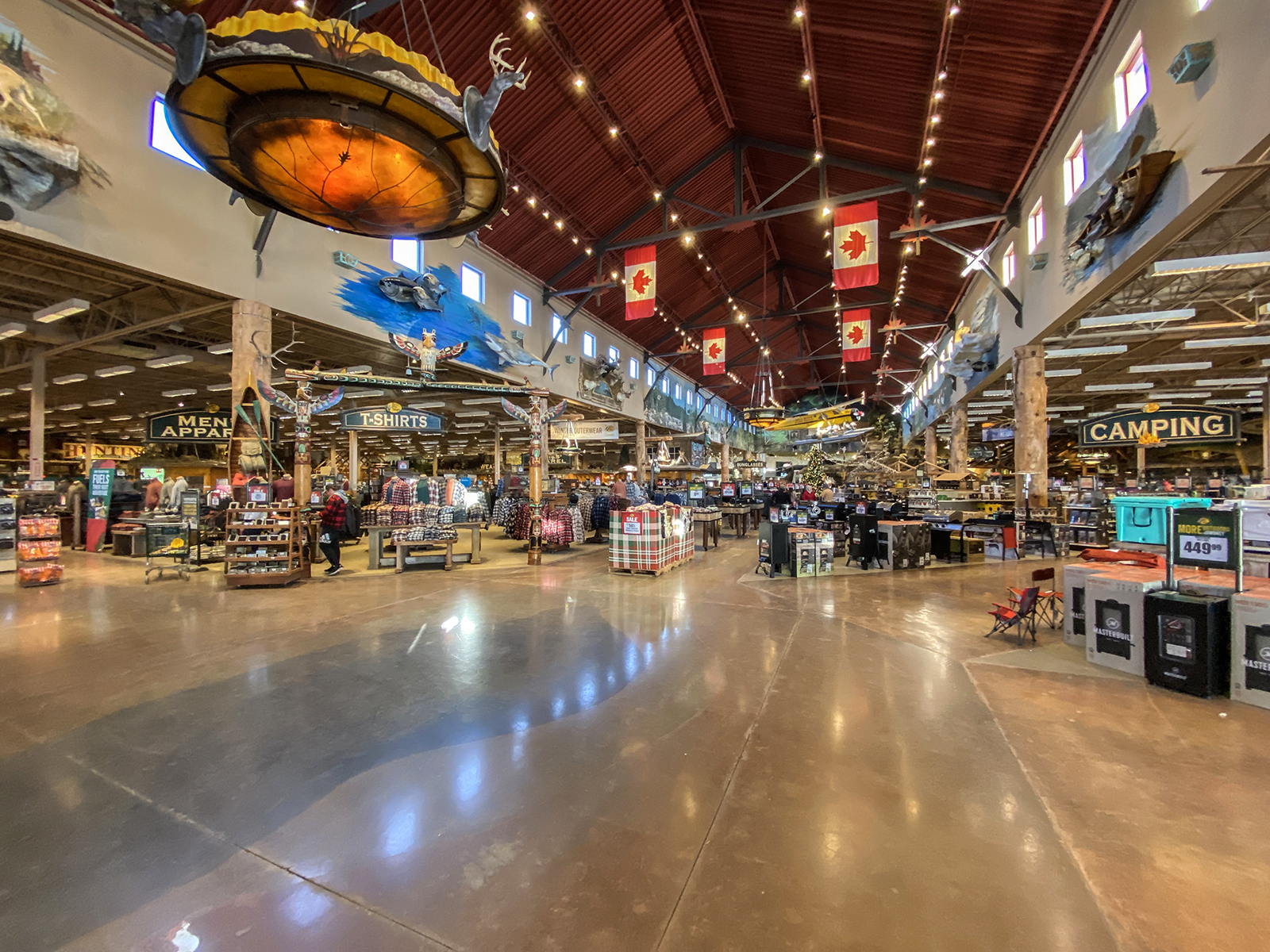
Bass Pro Shops at Vaughan Mills in Vaughan, Ontario

In 1972, 24-year-old Johnny Morris started selling fishing tackle out of his dad's Brown Derby Liquor Store in Springfield, Missouri. His father, John A. Morris, was a World War II veteran and often took the family hunting and fishing, which Johnny Morris cited as what taught him to love the outdoors. People who bought tackle from Morris in Springfield continued to request specialized gear from him even after they left the area. To meet their demand, Morris created the first Bass Pro Shops catalog in 1974. In 1978, Morris introduced Tracker Boats, the first boat, motor, and trailer package designed for anglers. Later the boats sold through Tracker Marine Group, owned by Bass Pro Shops.

In 1981, Morris opened the first Bass Pro Shops outdoor store in Springfield. A few years later in 1987, Morris bought an empty plot of land on Table Rock Lake in Missouri's Ozark Mountains. One year later, at that location, he opened Big Cedar Lodge resort. The resort has five golf courses, and an outdoor arena.

The second Bass Pro Shops location opened in Duluth, Georgia in 1995. From then until 2004, the company opened 3–4 stores a year, and 7–9 stores a year from 2005 to 2008. In 2006, the first store was opened in Colorado, and the first Bass Pro Shops Outdoor World in Arkansas opened in 2013. In 2015, Bass Pro Shops at the Pyramid opened in Memphis, Tennessee. The location includes interactive conservation exhibits, a giant cypress swamp, an alligator habitat, a hotel, restaurants, shopping, a bowling alley, a 28-story free-standing elevator, and an arcade.

The company acquired Cabela's Inc. for $4.5 billion in 2016.

In 2017, Morris opened the Wonders of Wildlife Museum & Aquarium adjacent to Springfield's Bass Pro Shops, which is considered the largest wildlife attraction in the world. In 2022, Bass Pro Shops announced a new Bass Pro fishing resort would be built in Marathon, Florida, on Valhalla Island. In July 2025, Bass Pro Shops and Big Cedar Lodge officially opened a new par-3 18-hole golf course called Cliffhangers, located in Hollister, Missouri.

Starting in 2010, and continuing through 2025, Bass Pro Shops has been accused of benefiting from billions in subsidies from taxpayers while failing to deliver on their promises of tourist and economic activity.

== Acquisitions ==
In 2016, the company acquired Cabela's Inc. for $4.5 billion.

The deal was financed via preferred equity financing from Goldman Sachs and Pamplona. Goldman Sachs contributed $1.8 billion towards financing and Pamplona contributed $600 million.

In 2019, Bass Pro Shops sold eleven of Cabela's stores to Sansome Pacific for $324.3 million in a sale-leaseback program. The acquisition of Cabela's resulted in 2,000 jobs lost in Sidney, Nebraska, Cabela's headquarters at the time of the acquisition. Since the acquisition, three stores have closed and eight new stores have opened. As part of Cabela's acquisition, the company agreed to sell the assets and liabilities of the World Foremost Bank to Synovus and Capital One, a transfer of over $1 billion in assets.

In 2020, Great Outdoors Group, the parent company of Bass Pro Shops and Cabela's, attempted to acquire Sportsman's Warehouse. However, the deal was canceled in 2021 after the Federal Trade Commission indicated they were not going to provide clearance.

In 2023, Bass Pro Shops and Bluegreen Corporation announced plans to acquire the Branson Cedars Resort.

In September 2025, Bass Pro Shops and White River Marine Group announced the acquisition of water sports brand Hobie Cat, with plans to return Hobie production and jobs from Mexico to Lebanon, Missouri. This acquisition united two manufacturers with a combined 128 years of providing watercraft to outdoor enthusiasts around the world.

== Operating divisions ==
=== Retail stores ===
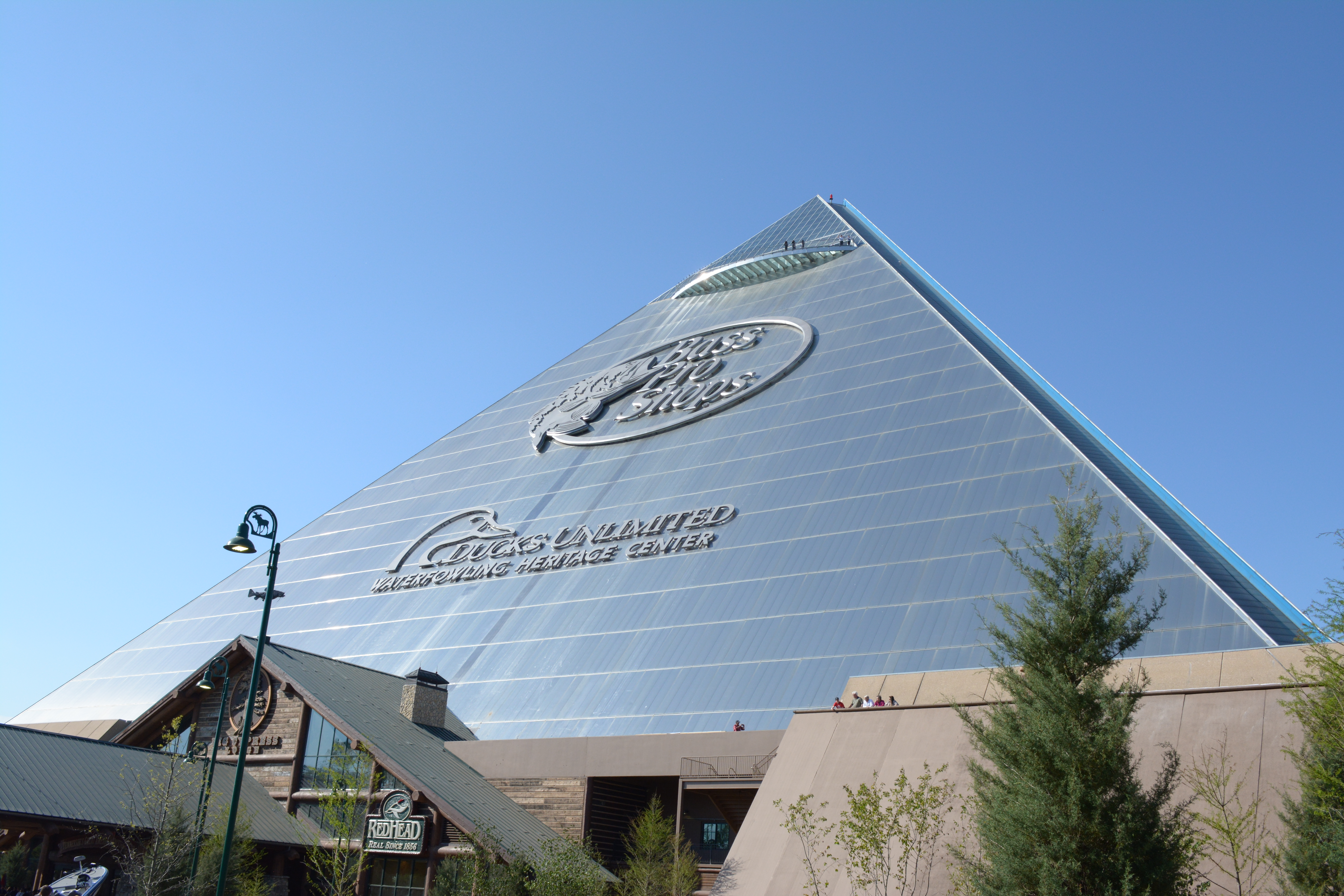
Bass Pro Shops at the Memphis Pyramid

Bass Pro Shops and Cabela's operates retail locations in the United States, as well as in Canada. The most common stores are Outdoor World stores. Their largest store is the Pyramid in Memphis, Tennessee. As of March 2026, the company operates 181 Bass Pro Shops and Cabela's stores combined.

==== Store types ====
At every Bass Pro location, there are names on the front of the buildings to represent their theme and location, commonly named based on the local area. As of 2022, there are five types of stores: Outdoor World, Outpost, Stick Marsh Outpost, Sportsman's Center, and White River Outpost. All locations contain an aquarium as well as animal statues, waterfalls, etc. Fourteen of the stores have replica natural habitat displays created by TreeScapes & PlantWorks.

- Outdoor World: Themed around a cypress forest. Features wood and rock architecture, faux rivers, animal displays, trees, foliage, and murals of outdoor scenes. The Outdoor World in Harrisburg has a 60,000 gallon aquarium. The Denver location was created with a "great lodge" theme. It includes a log and rockwork entrance, a gabled clerestory, outdoor-themed chandeliers, concrete flooring imprinted with dinosaur fossils and wildlife tracks, and a 21,000-gallon freshwater aquarium.
- Outpost: Themed around a wooden outpost similar to a cabin or cottage. Intended to feature less theming in the aisles than Outdoor World. The stores include aquariums and water features, local antiques and artifacts, trophy fish and wildlife mounts, and murals of local scenes. One Outpost was designed with a lobby that resembles an old boat yard warehouse and blacksmith's shop.
- Sportsman's Center: Sportsman's Center locations include a less themed exterior, but many animal displays and foliage inside. The Miami, Florida location is themed around an underwater exploration and includes a sunken ship display that doubles as a 19,000-gallon saltwater aquarium.
- Stick Marsh Outpost: Themed around a slightly deteriorated outpost in the Everglades, featuring swamp murals, trees, swamp animal statues, photo collections, hanging willow leaves, and an old pickup truck on the ceiling. It is unique to the Palm Bay, Florida location.
- White River Outpost: Themed around the forests along the White River in the Ozarks, featuring wooden walls, trees, and has many photo collections. It is unique to the Branson, Missouri location.

=== Boat brands ===
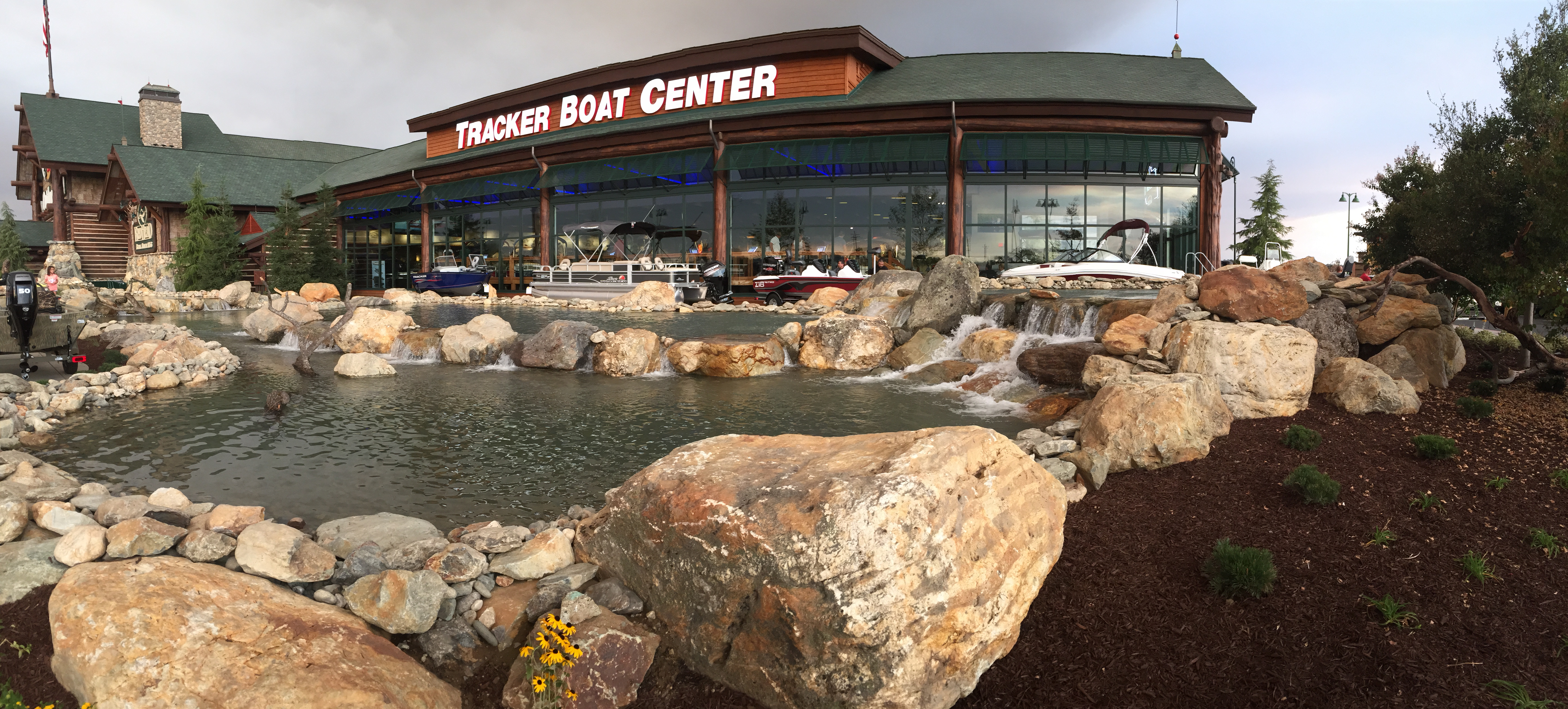
The Tracker Boat Center at the Bass Pro Shops location in Rocklin, California

Bass Pro Shops owns White River Marine Group which manufactures and distributes boats under the brand names Ranger, Nitro, Triton, Tahoe, Tracker, Sun Tracker, Regency, Mako, and Ascend.

On May 20, 2021, the White River Marine Group purchased Hatteras Yachts, a company that specializes in yachts and speedboats.

=== Hospitality ===
Bass Pro Shops owns a number of resorts and restaurant brands, some of which are included here.

==== Resorts ====
- Big Cedar Lodge: Located on Table Rock Lake in Missouri's Ozark Mountains. The resort has five golf courses that have been recognized with several awards, and an outdoor arena, Thunder Ridge Nature Arena. The newest course, Cliffhangers, features dramatic elevation changes, holes ranging from 60 to 170 yards, and is carved into the regions well known limestone cliffs. The course was featured in the semi-finals of the inaugural Internet Invitational, which was filmed in August 2025 and aired in from October to November 2025.
- Big Cypress Lodge: Located inside the Bass Pro Shops in the Pyramid in Memphis. It is the only hotel located inside a Bass Pro Shops store. The hotel offers regular rooms, suites, cabins, and treehouses.
- Angler's Lodge: Located in Hollister, Missouri.
- Valhalla Island Resort: This resort was announced in 2022 and will be located in Marathon in the Florida Keys. Over half of the development will remain as green space.

==== Restaurants ====
- Uncle Buck's FishBowl & Grill.
- White River Fish House.
- Hemingway's Blue Water Cafe.
- Finley Farms: which includes The Workshop (crafting and coffee shop); The Farm (an urban farm with fruits, vegetables, and flowers); The Garrison (fine dining); and The Ozark Mill (restaurant and event space).

== Outreach ==
=== Conservation ===
Bass Pro Shops has supported conservation initiatives in North America, contributing to conservation organizations and initiatives. The company partners with conservation groups Ducks Unlimited, the National Wild Turkey Federation, the Rocky Mountain Elk Foundation, and the National Fish and Wildlife Foundation.

In 2019, Morris and his family were awarded the Audubon Medal, in a ceremony at The Plaza Hotel in New York. The award was presented for a "lifetime passion for conservation and sharing the outdoors with everyone." National leaders from throughout the conservation community recognized Morris for his conservation leadership.

In 2023, the University of Missouri Board of Curators approved the naming of the Johnny Morris Institute of Fisheries, Wetlands and Aquatic Systems, in recognition of the Bass Pro founder's contributions to conservation.

==== Johnny Morris Bass Pro Shops and Cabela's Outdoor Fund ====
The Outdoor Fund is a 501(c)(3) nonprofit. Customers at Bass Pro Shops and Cabela's can donate to it by choosing to round up their purchases to support different conservation partners and projects.

==== Wonders of Wildlife National Museum and Aquarium ====
Bass Pro's Wonders of Wildlife National Museum and Aquarium partners with the U.S. Fish and Wildlife Services and National Oceanic and Atmospheric Administration to care for sea turtles that are found injured, hosting them at the facilities sea turtle center. Some of the sea turtles are unable to be returned to the wild and remain at the aquarium, while others are rehabilitated and released. The aquarium has around 35,000 animals representing over 800 species and was voted "America's Best Aquarium" in 2018, 2020-2026.

- Sea turtles—Every year since 2021, WOW has hosted critically-ill sea turtles suffering from cold-stunned phenomenon, caused by sudden drops in ocean temperatures and leaving them immobile and susceptible to severe conditions such as hypothermia, pneumonia, dehydration and unable to forage for food and defend themselves. This treatment includes hydration therapy, wound management, nutritional support and specialized veterinarian care.

In February 2025, Newsweek recognized Wonders of Wildlife as Best Aquarium in its Readers' Choice Awards.

In May 2026, Wonders of Wildlife was voted America's Best Aquarium for an eighth time by USA Today readers, as part of its 10Best Readers' Choice Awards.

==== Audubon International Signature Sanctuary ====
All five golf courses at Big Cedar Lodge are designated as Audubon International Signature Sanctuary locations. The certification process includes an evaluation of land management practices and land use, multiple site visits, and the implementation of a Natural Resource Management Plan that covers wildlife conservation and habitat enhancement, water quality monitoring and management, integrated pest management, water conservation, energy efficiency, waste reduction and management, and green building products and procedures. Big Cedar Lodge is the only resort in the world that has all of its golf courses designated as Audubon International Signature Sanctuary locations.

==== Thunder Ridge Nature Arena ====
The Thunder Ridge Nature Arena sits on the 1,200 acre Thunder Ridge property at Big Cedar Lodge. This land was set aside as a nonprofit foundation. All proceeds from events held at the arena are used to enhance Thunder Ridge land and support conservation efforts. In July 2024, the Rolling Stones performed at the arena.

=== Convoy of Hope ===
Bass Pro Shops has partnered with Convoy of Hope to provide disaster relief for those affected by tornadoes, wildfires, floods, and hurricanes. Support has included food, supplies, donations, and boats.

=== Military and veterans organizations ===
Bass Pro Shops supports military and veterans organizations and events such as the United Service Organizations (USO), AMVETS, Helping a Hero, Folds of Honor, the Shadow Warrior Project's golf tournaments, and the 2021 Missouri Veterans Fishin' Contest. Every month the company hosts Military Discount Days, giving active duty and retired military a discount off regularly priced items.

In 2022, The Association of the United States Army (AUSA) awarded Bass Pro Shops and Johnny Morris the National Service Award for "recognition of exemplary service and demonstrated enduring support to the American Soldier and the United States Army community."

In 2024, Bass Pro Shops partnered with the Army & Air Force Exchange Service to provide savings on outdoor gear to veterans and active-duty military members in the US and abroad.

==== Helping a Hero ====
In 2021, Bass Pro Shops held the Helping a Hero telethon to raise awareness for the 100 Homes Challenge issued by Johnny Morris. Under the challenge, Bass Pro Shops paid for 25% of the next 100 homes built by Helping a Hero. The company also paid 100% of the cost of 10 homes. Helping a Hero uses community support to provide wounded veterans with homes adapted to their possible disabilities.

== Sponsorships ==
=== Conservation ===
Bass Pro Shops works with a number of organizations to sponsor conservation. These include:

- Rocky Mountain Elk Foundation
- Pheasants Forever
- National Fish and Wildlife Foundation (NFWF)
- Ducks Unlimited
- National Deer Association
- National Wild Turkey Federation
- Theodore Roosevelt Conservation Partnership
- Congressional Sportsmen's Foundation

=== Affiliation with NASCAR ===
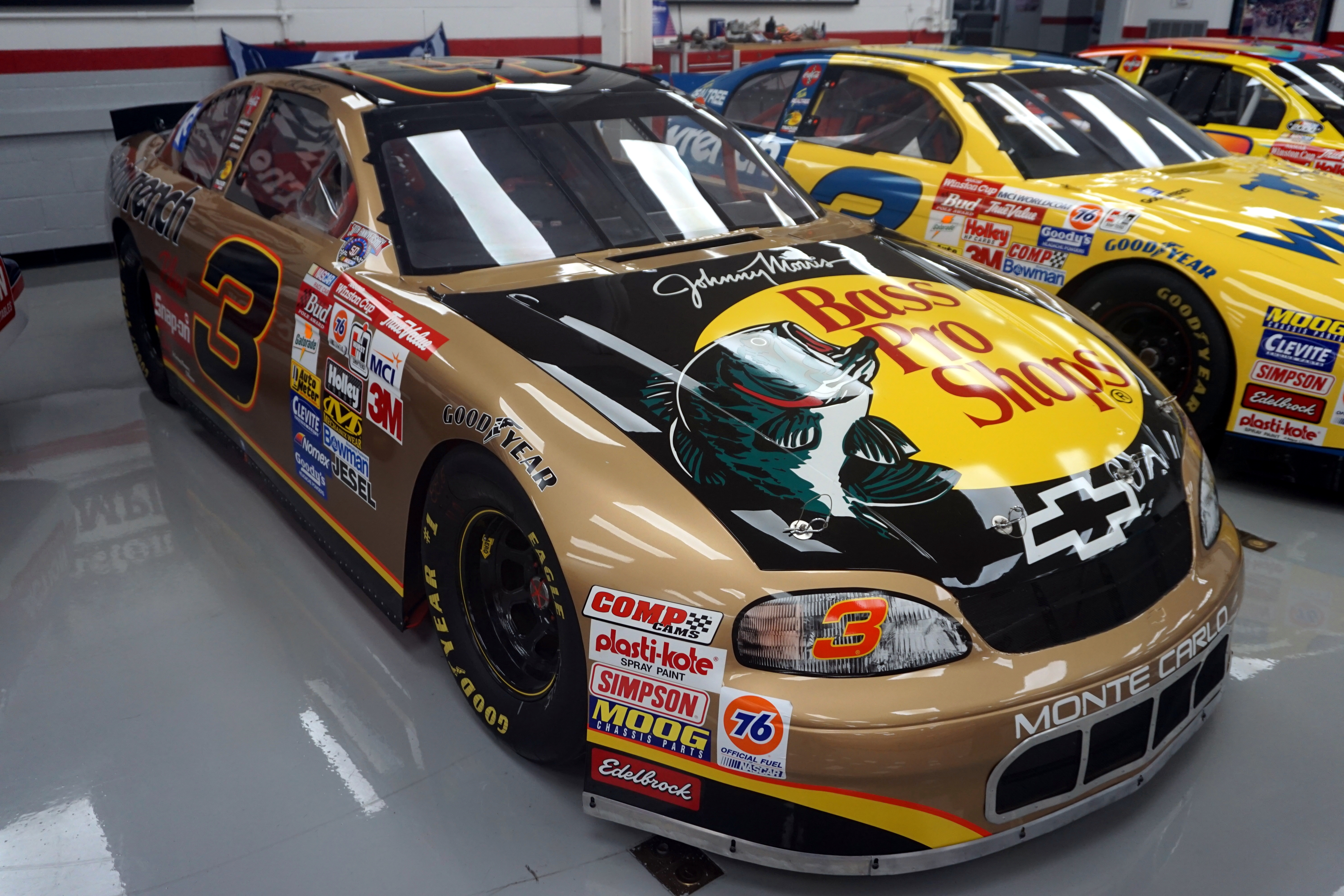
Dale Earnhardt's No. 3 Bass Pro Shops Chevrolet Monte Carlo on display at the Richard Childress Racing Museum

Since 1998, Bass Pro Shops has been a partner of Richard Childress Racing. As of the 2025 NASCAR Cup Series season, they are the primary sponsor for the No. 3 car driven by Austin Dillon of Richard Childress Racing, the No. 19 car driven by Chase Briscoe of Joe Gibbs Racing for all 36 races, and the No. 56 car driven by Martin Truex Jr. of TRICON Garage. Bass Pro Shops also sponsors and hosts the Bass Pro Shops Night Race at Bristol Motor Speedway.

In previous seasons, they have also sponsored Dale Earnhardt, Tony Stewart, Jamie McMurray, Ryan Newman, Ty Dillon, and Daniel Hemric. The company also sponsored Dale Earnhardt Jr.'s one-off Xfinity race.

=== NRA National Sporting Arms Museum ===
The National Rifle Association National Sporting Arms Museum opened in Springfield's Bass Pro Shop on August 2, 2013. It features sporting artifacts, including some historical firearms from the NRA Museum Collection. The museum also hosts firearms and artwork from the Remington Arms Company factory collection, including engraved Colt revolvers of the American frontier and firearms of U.S. Presidents.

=== Professional Bull Riders ===
Bass Pro Shops has been a sponsor of the Professional Bull Riders (PBR) circuit for several years. In 2022, it became the primary sponsor of the Missouri Thunder; one of eight founding teams of the PBR Team Series, which debuted that year. Johnny Morris is the team owner. In 2026, the Missouri Thunder won the inaugural Monster Energy Team Challenge Championship.

== Accolades and awards ==
In 2018, the National Retail Federation ranked Bass Pro Shops as the No. 2 Hottest Retailer in America, and the following year in 2019 was named one of America's Most Reputable Companies by Forbes.

In 2021, Newsweek ranked Bass Pro Shops and Cabela's as the top outdoor retailer in its list of America's Best Trending Online Shops, and in 2020, recognized the brands with Best-In-State Customer Service Awards across 16 states.

In 2021, the Bass Pro Shops U.S. Open National Bass Fishing Amateur Team Championships awarded a $1 million first-place prize to the winning team, Tucker Smith and Logan Parks, two students from Auburn University. The same year, Forbes named Bass Pro Shops one of America's Best Employers, with rankings among the top 10 in the country. They received this same accolade in both 2022 and 2023.

In 2023, Bass Pro Shops and Cabela’s were recognized as the retail leader in the Camping & Outdoor Gear category by Newsweek, ranking first and second, respectively. It was the second year in a row for that same honor.

In the 2025 Most Trusted Brands survey, Bass Pro Shops and Cabela's were ranked the most trusted U.S. retailers for hunting and fishing gear. They ranked second for both fishing lures and camping equipment. Later this same year, they were awarded 4½ out of 5 stars in Newsweek's "America's Most Admired Workplaces" list for 2025.

In October 2026, Bass Pro Shops was included in the 2027 Forbes Best Customer Service list.

== Lawsuits ==
In 2011, Bass Pro Shops was sued by the U.S. Equal Employment Opportunity Commission (EEOC) for failure to hire Hispanic and black applicants. In court filings, Bass Pro Shops denied all of the allegations and in 2014, Bass Pro Shops appealed the lower court's ruling, but was rejected by the court. In 2016, Bass Pro Shops tried again and the U.S. EEOC asked the Fifth Circuit Court to reject Bass Pro Shops' appeal because Bass Pro Shops engaged in the practice of "reckless indifference" when it came to hiring minorities. In 2017, Bass Pro Shops settled its discrimination lawsuit with the U.S. EEOC for $10.5 million. The court noted that any payments Bass Pro Shops made as part of the settlement "should not be construed as an admission of liability." The case was settled by a consent decree, and the court issued no findings on the veracity of the claims of the EEOC that there had been discrimination. As part of the settlement, Bass Pro Shops agreed to strengthen its diversity hiring and recruiting practices by posting job openings at schools with a significant minority population, participating in job fairs held in communities with large minority populations, posting job openings in publications that have been historically popular with Black and Hispanic audiences, and develop a diversity and inclusion section of its website that lists job opportunities and discusses inclusion efforts.

In 2022, Bass Pro Shops was sued for not honoring a lifetime warranty on "RedHead Lifetime Guarantee All Purpose Wool Socks."

In June 2025, a proposed class-action lawsuit was filed against Bass Pro Shops and Cabela's, accusing the companies of conspiring with manufacturers and distributors of archery equipment, as well as the Archery Trade Association, to engage in price fixing that harmed consumers through artificially inflated prices.

== See also ==
- Academy Sports + Outdoors
- Cabela's
- Dick's Sporting Goods
- Legendary Whitetails
- Scheels
- Sportsman's Warehouse
- List of Missouri companies
