= Union Sportsmen's Alliance =

US non-profit organization

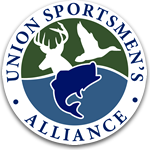
- Founded: January 15, 2007
- Location: Nashville, Tennessee
- Region served: Nationwide
- Key people: Fred Myers (Executive Director)
- Website: unionsportsmen.org

The Union Sportsmen's Alliance (USA) is a union-operated, union-dedicated, conservation organization. It is committed to uniting the more than six million active and retired AFL-CIO trade union members who hunt, fish, shoot and recreate outdoors into one community with a shared commitment to educate future generations of sportsmen and sportswomen, conserve healthy wildlife habitat and volunteer their time and skills for projects that improve outdoor access for all.

The Union Sportsmen's Alliance goal is to become North America's largest community of Union sportsmen and women committed to preserving outdoor heritage for generations to come.

The USA is non-partisan and does not take positions on or endorse political agendas, parties or candidates. This statement does not reflect, in any way, on how the USA's participating unions communicate with their members on political, legislative or policy issues.

== History ==
In 2007 the Theodore Roosevelt Conservation Partnership and Union leaders saw a unique opportunity to form a union-dedicated conservation based organization—the Union Sportsmen's Alliance. It was founded on January 15, 2007, at the SHOT (Shooting, Hunting, and Outdoor Trades) Show in Orlando, Florida.

In May 2010, just three years after its creation, the Union Sportsmen's Alliance grew strong enough to become a stand-alone hunting, fishing and conservation organization with more than 20,000 members from across the U.S. and Canada. In the fall of 2013, the Union Sportsmen's Alliance surpassed 100,000 members.

== See also ==
- Theodore Roosevelt Conservation Partnership
