= Sportsman's Warehouse =

American outdoor sporting goods retailer

Sportsman's Warehouse Inc.

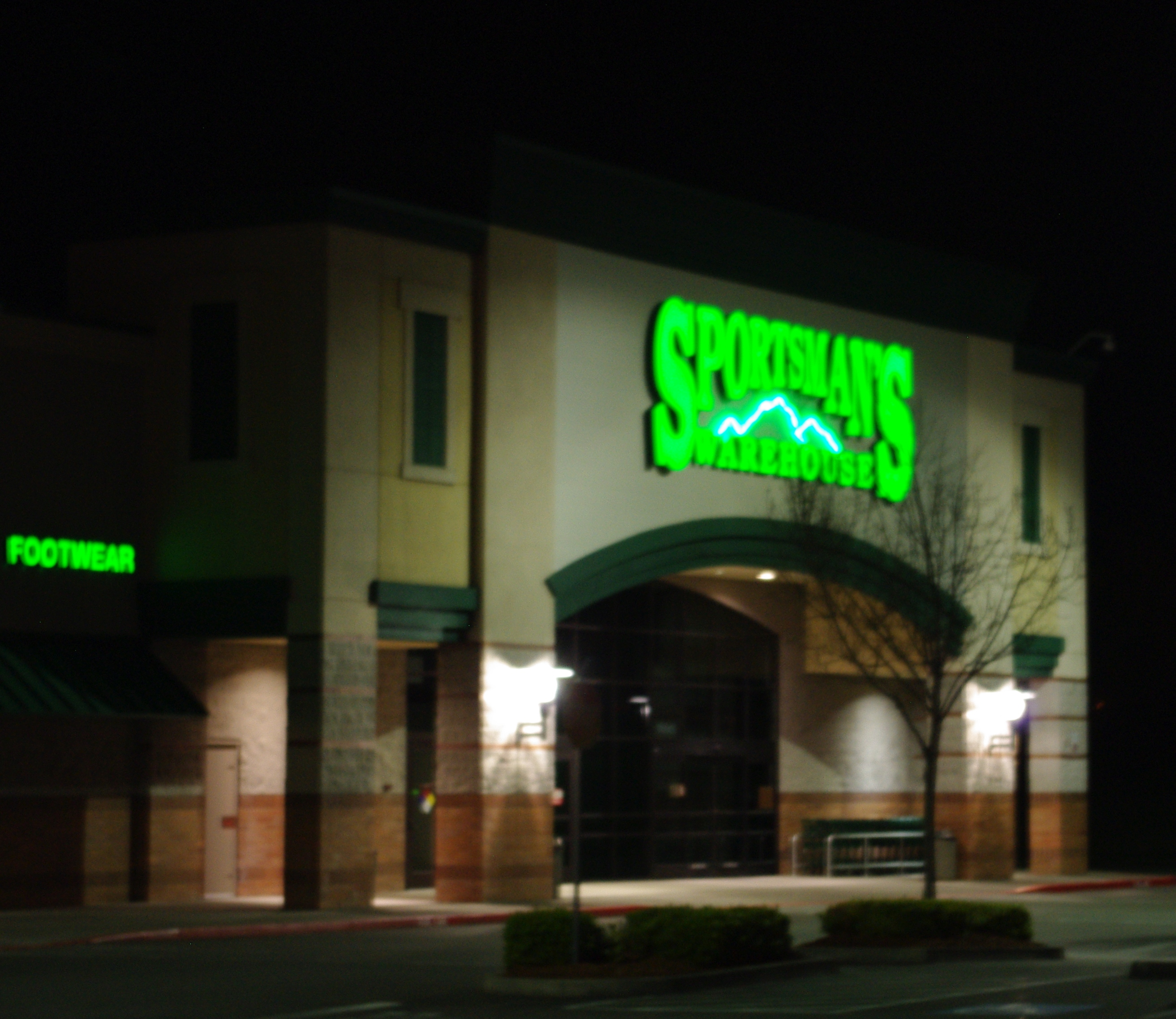
- Location in Hillsboro, Oregon
- Type: Public
- Traded as: Nasdaq: SPWH; Russell 2000 Component
- Industry: Retail
- Founded: 1986; 40 years ago
- Founder: Bill Hayes
- Headquarters: Midvale, Utah
- Number of locations: 145 (2026)
- Key people: Paul Stone (CEO)
- Products: Firearms, Hunting and Shooting, Archery, Fishing, Camping, Boating, ATV accessories, Optics, Electronics, Knives, Footwear, Hunting and Outdoor Apparel
- Revenue: ▲US$1.21 billion (2025)
- Net income: ▼ −US$50.1 million (2025)
- Number of employees: 5,100 (2019)
- Website: www.sportsmans.com

Sportsman's Warehouse is an American outdoor sporting goods retailer which operates in 29 states across the United States. Sportsman's Warehouse sells apparel, footwear, and gear which caters to sportsmen and sportswomen with interests in hunting, shooting, reloading, camping, fishing, and other outdoor recreational activities.

== Trademark ==
The Sportsman's Warehouse trademark is "America's Premier Outfitter", which was adopted in 2005.

== History ==
Sportsman's Warehouse specializes in retail sales of outdoor sporting goods, including hunting, fishing, camping, and related recreational equipment.

=== Founding and early years ===
1986: Sportsman's Warehouse was founded in 1986 by Bill Hayes in Midvale, Utah. The company initially operated as a single-store retailer focused on serving outdoor enthusiasts with a broad selection of specialized gear and apparel.

=== Expansion and Growth ===
1996-2000s: Throughout the late 1990s and early 2000s, Sportsman's Warehouse expanded its footprint, opening additional stores across the Western United States. The company continued to grow, building a reputation for its extensive selection of outdoor gear and knowledgeable staff.

2004: Sportsman's Warehouse went public, with its shares listed on the NASDAQ. The move was aimed at raising capital to fund further expansion and development.

=== Challenges and Ownership Changes ===
2006: The company faced financial difficulties, and in 2006, it filed for bankruptcy. This led to a restructuring process where the company closed several stores but remained operational.

2009: Sportsman's Warehouse emerged from bankruptcy and was acquired by the private equity firm, The Blackstone Group. The acquisition was intended to help stabilize the company and support its growth.

=== Further Expansion ===
2010s: Under new ownership and with a renewed focus, Sportsman's Warehouse continued to expand its store base, opening new locations and improving its retail operations. The company introduced new product lines and enhanced its in-store experience.

In 2014, Sportsman's Warehouse returned to public markets, filing for an initial public offering on the NASDAQ under the ticker symbol SPWH. The IPO was intended to support continued expansion and debt reduction following the company’s restructuring.

=== Recent Developments ===
2018: Sportsman's Warehouse opened its 100th store, marking a significant milestone in its growth trajectory.

2020s: The company has continued to focus on expanding its market presence and improving its e-commerce capabilities. It has also engaged in various community initiatives and partnerships to support outdoor activities and conservation efforts.

Today, Sportsman's Warehouse is known for its wide range of outdoor sporting goods and its commitment to serving outdoor enthusiasts. The company operates stores across the United States and remains a significant player in the outdoor retail industry.

== See also ==
- Academy Sports + Outdoors
- Bass Pro Shops
- Cabela's
- Dick's Sporting Goods
- Scheels
- List of Utah companies
