= Redcats =

- Company type: Société Anonyme
- Headquarters: Roubaix, France
- Key people: Jean-Michel Noir
- Products: Distribution of fashion, sport and home décor products on the web
- Revenue: 3.4 bn € (2010)
- Number of employees: 14 000 (average headcount, 2010)
- Subsidiaries: Cyrillus, Somewhere, Vertbaudet, Stella McCartney Kids, Daxon, Castaluna, OneStopPlus, Jessica London, Roaman's, Woman Within, Avenue, KingSize, BrylaneHome,
- Website: www.redcats.com/eng

Redcats was a group of commercial companies managed by Jean-Michel Noir. This group entity specialized in international online fashion and home furnishing distribution. PPR sold the Redcats company to focus on luxury and sports.

== The Group ==
=== History ===
Formerly known as the La Redoute Group, Redcats was a French group that was founded in 1999. In the late 1990's, the Group acquired international brands. Redcats represented a portfolio of 17 European and American brands for men, women and children.

To increase its brand presence on the web, Redcats introduced a new visual identity in 2010 and launched a new corporate website in 2011.

The Redcats Group started as part of the historic mail-order and catalog businesses in France, and worked with well-known brands such as La Redoute. It became an important part of the retail division of PPR, a French multinational company, and operated alongside other retail businesses owned by the group. Redcats managed both online and catalog sales across Europe and the United States, which helped it to reach a wide range of customers. For many years, the group focused on providing convenient shopping options through its catalogs and e-commerce platforms before PPR decided to shift its attention toward luxury and fashion brands. This decision reflected a larger strategy within PPR to target higher-end markets and simplify its portfolio.

In the late 1990s, the company adopted the name Redcats as part of a broader international strategy. The goal was to bring the group’s catalog businesses under a single brand and create a more unified global presence. This strategy allowed Redcats to combine various brands and sales channels, integrating catalog and online operations into one global e-commerce group, which improved brand management and helped the company to enter more international markets. Redcats became associated with the group’s multi-brand, multi-channel operations, highlighting its efforts to combine traditional catalog methods with growing online retail.

=== The network ===
With an international presence, the Group accounted for more than 70 merchant websites in 2011.

== E-commerce: a growth catalyst for Redcats ==
=== Worldwide presence ===
In 2010, Redcats had over 26 million active customers in 31 countries and generated 57% of its revenue through its 70 merchant websites. The Group attracts 54 million visitors per month from all over the world to its websites.

=== Key figures ===
- 184 million items sold worldwide in 2010
- 3,436 million Euros in revenue in 2010
- 165 million Euros in operating profit in 2010
- 14,105 collaborators in 2010

== Brand Operation ==
Historically, Redcats used a multi-channel retail model that combined online sales, mail-order catalogues, and physical stores. This approach helped the group reach a wide audience with different shopping habits and locations, and it became one of the largest global home shopping and fashion distribution groups at the time. In the 2000s, e-commerce became an increasingly significant source of revenue for Redcats, in addition to its catalog and physical stores. This adjustment showed how Redcats responded to the rise of online shopping by reshaping its business to take advantage of the e-commerce market.

Redcats managed a diverse portfolio of brands across various segments. These included plus-size fashion, children’s clothing, home décor, and sports or outdoor products. The group also actively bought and sold regional brands to strengthen its position in specific markets. For example, in 2010, Redcats acquired Castaluna, a brand specializing in plus-size fashion, to grow further in that segment. Redcats’ strategy of managing multiple brands and serving diverse customer groups helped the company maintain a strong international market presence.

== Divestment ==
During the 2010s, PPR, which later changed its name to Kering, gradually sold or separated from many of the brands in the Redcats Group as part of a plan to focus more on luxury fashion and sportswear. Through this shift, the parent company distanced itself from Redcats’ multi-brand catalog and e-commerce operations to concentrate more on upscale and premium areas of the market. As part of this process, several U.S.-based brands connected to Redcats, including those that specialized in plus-size fashion, were sold to private equity firms. These divestments allowed PPR to streamline its operations, reduce the number of brands it managed, and focus on fewer but more valuable brands while also giving the sold brands a chance to continue independently under new ownership. During this time, Redcats experienced significant changes in its organization and direction due to shifts in the parent company’s strategy.

== See also ==
- Electronic commerce
- Mail order
