= Theodore Roosevelt Conservation Partnership =

US non-profit organization

- Type: 501(c)(3)
- Location: Washington, D.C.
- Members: 30,000+
- Chief Executive Officer: Joel Pedersen
- Website: www.trcp.org

The Theodore Roosevelt Conservation Partnership (TRCP) is a non-profit 501(c)(3) coalition of conservation organizations, grassroots partners and outdoor related businesses, the main goal of which is increased federal funding for conservation while preserving access for hunters and fishers. It has lobbied policymakers to do more to address the challenge of climate change, which they say will have a significant impact on the sportsmen community and has teamed with the National Wildlife Federation and Trout Unlimited to form "Sportsmen for Responsible Energy Development", which works to preserve natural resources and forests.

As of December 2014, the president and CEO was Whit Fosburgh. In 2013, the organization's revenue was $3.7 million and it spent 84.1% of its income on programs.

== See also ==
- Union Sportsmen's Alliance
