= National Wild Turkey Federation =

Conservation organization

- Abbreviation: NWTF
- Formation: 1973; 53 years ago
- Type: Wildlife Conservation
- Headquarters: Edgefield, South Carolina, United States
- Region served: North America
- Members: More than 250,000
- Key people: Jason Burckhalter, co-CEO Kurt Dyroff, co-CEO
- Website: https://www.nwtf.org/

The National Wild Turkey Federation is an international non-profit organization whose mission is 'the conservation of the wild turkey and the preservation of our hunting heritage.' It currently has more than 250,000 members in the United States, Canada, Mexico and 14 other countries.

== Introduction ==
The National Wild Turkey Federation (NWTF) is a private, non-profit conservation and education organization founded in 1973 with a mission dedicated to conserving wild turkeys and preserving hunting heritage.

The NWTF's more than 250,000 members and volunteers, along with its wildlife agency and corporate partners, have helped restore and manage North America's current population of more than 7 million wild turkeys. In addition, the NWTF, along with their conservation partners and members, has helped acquire or improve habitat on more than 17,000,000 acres (69,000 km^{2}) of public, private and corporate lands and spent more than $372 million on habitat conservation and outreach programs.

Through its outreach programs, the NWTF family claims to have helped thousands of women, children and people with disabilities across North America learn outdoor skills. NWTF sponsors organizations and programs such as JAKES, Women in the Outdoors and Wheelin' Sportsmen, launching them with the stated goal of helping people to better enjoy the outdoors as well as understand the importance of wildlife management and appreciate hunting as an honorable pursuit.

== Hunting Heritage Super Fund Banquets ==
The NWTF's primary fundraiser is the Hunting Heritage Super Fund Banquet, where NWTF members and volunteers gather to socialize and to purchase firearms and merchandise that are exclusively sold at NWTF banquets.

The Hunting Heritage Super Fund Banquet program was created in 1983 to entice members to support the NWTF, while introducing new people to conservation and the outdoors.

Money raised through the Super Fund program is used to conduct Hunting Heritage Super Fund projects, including conservation and outreach projects in the states raising the funds.

Through the Hunting Heritage Super Fund, NWTF volunteers and partners have spent more than $372 million upholding hunting traditions and conserving more than 17,000,000 acres (69,000 km^{2}) of wildlife habitat.

== Conservation ==
The NWTF supports scientific wildlife management on public, private and corporate lands. NWTF founders established a technical committee consisting of wild turkey biologists from state and provincial wildlife agencies who make recommendations on research, management, restoration and educational programs.

Wild Turkey Partnership Agreements provide the framework for cooperative wildlife management, research and educational activities between the NWTF and its agency and corporate partners. These partnerships improve millions of acres of wildlife habitat on private, corporate and public land. NWTF wildlife professionals provide information to help these partners use cutting-edge wildlife management strategies in their forest and open land management programs.

=== Making Tracks ===
Making Tracks is the cooperative program between the NWTF and state, federal and provincial wildlife agencies to restore wild turkeys to all suitable habitat in North America. The NWTF works with wildlife agencies coordinating the trap and transfer of wild turkeys. Wild turkey populations have more than doubled since 1990. In areas where they are abundant, wild turkeys are trapped via nets propelled or dropped over a feeding flock. Trapped birds are individually placed in specialized transport boxes, and then released in areas of suitable habitat with few or no wild turkeys. The NWTF routinely provides trapping equipment, transfer boxes and helps coordinate wild turkey transfers between states, provinces and nations. Since the 1950s, state and provincial wildlife agencies have moved more than 192,000 wild turkeys into suitable habitat across North America. The NWTF, founded in 1973, helped accelerate those efforts by providing trapping equipment, transfer boxes, funding and volunteers. Currently, there are more than 7 million wild turkeys throughout North America.

The NWTF partners with federal, state and provincial wildlife agencies to conduct Hunting Heritage Super Fund projects. Hunting Heritage Super Fund projects include establishing walk-in hunting areas, planting wildlife openings, developing water resources, conducting prescribed burns, co-hosting outdoor learning events for women, children and individuals with disabilities through the NWTF's 2,350 chapters across the country and supporting the reintroduction of the Gould's wild turkey in Arizona.

=== North American Wild Turkey Management Plan ===
The North American Wild Turkey Management Plan is designed to identify wild turkey habitat and potential habitat projects throughout North America using GIS (geographic information systems) technology. The plan has helped establish wild turkey populations on approximately 2,000,000 acres (8,100 km^{2}) in North America. The future focus of the plan will be identifying key habitat projects and important areas for wild turkeys on a state by state basis. The plan has received national and international endorsement from the Association of Fish and Wildlife Agencies and the Trilateral Committee for Wildlife and Ecosystem Management.

=== Go for the Gould's ===
Since 2003, the Arizona Game and Fish Department and the NWTF have transferred 320 Gould's wild turkeys from Mexico and Arizona to the Chiricahua, Huachuca, Mule and Pinalenos mountains, along with the Santa Ritas and Santa Catalinas mountains of southern Arizona, an area where the Gould's once thrived but was extirpated. Since 2000, the NWTF has spent more than $428,000 on Gould's wild turkey restoration. See the video of Gould's Turkey Release

=== Project HELP ===
Project HELP (Habitat Enhancement Land Program) is an NWTF program developed to help landowners manage and enhance their land by providing guidance and offering seeds and seedlings at competitive prices. Since 1992, sales have resulted in more than 3 million pounds of seed and 2.5 million seedlings, equaling a total of 161,000 acres (650 km^{2}) being planted for wild turkeys and other wildlife.

=== Regional Habitat Programs ===
The NWTF's Regional Habitat Programs provide seeds, tree seedlings and other habitat improvement products to NWTF chapters and private landowners across North America. There are eight programs including:

Operation Appleseed (Northeast)

Operation Oak (Southeast)

Operation Heartland (Midwest)

Operation SOS (Upper Midwest and Ontario, Canada)

Operation Big Sky (Great Plains)

Guzzlers for Gobblers (West)

Southern Great Plains Riparian Initiative

Northern Plains Riparian Restoration Initiative

Since 1997, the NWTF has planted 1.5 million seedlings, conducted 856 water development projects, provided 300 tons of oat hay and left 2,500 acres (10 km^{2}) of standing grain to assist landowners with large wintering populations of wild turkeys. Through the Guzzlers program alone, the NWTF and its partners have put more than $3.5 million toward habitat improvement projects in the West. The regional habitat programs have improved more than 5,700,000 acres (23,000 km^{2}) for wildlife.

== Outreach Programs ==
=== Families Afield ===
The NWTF is leading the way in promoting youth hunting opportunities through the Families Field Initiative. Joining the NWTF to reduce hunting barriers, are the U.S. Sportsmenπs Alliance, the National Shooting Sports Foundation and the National Rifle Association. Through Families Afield, date from the Youth Hunting Report is used to help remove barriers for new and young hunters across the nation. To date, Families Afield legislation and regulation changes have helped introduce more than 87,000 new hunters to the field.

=== JAKES/Xtreme JAKES ===
The NWTF's JAKES (Juniors Acquiring Knowledge, Ethics and Sportsmanship) program was developed in 1981 and is dedicated to teaching the principles of wildlife management and passing along the traditions of safe, ethical and responsible hunting, as well as other activities ranging from fishing to hiking. The program is designed for children up to age 12.

The NWTF's Xtreme JAKES program was developed in 2002 for teens between the ages of 13 and 18. The program provides advanced outdoor opportunities and challenges more in line with older teens' abilities and experiences.

=== NWTF Academic Scholarship Program ===
Each year, the NWTF presents a $10,000 national scholarship to a college bound student, as well as several $1,000 state/provincial academic scholarships and many $250 local scholarships. The NWTF also partners with the FFA to provide a $5,000 scholarship to a student pursuing a wildlife management or agriculture degree. The scholarship fund is administered through the National FFA. Every year, nearly $500,000 in scholarships are available to JAKES/Xtreme JAKES members. To date, more than $2.2 million has been awarded by the NWTF through its scholarship program.

=== Wheelin' Sportsmen NWTF ===
Wheelin' Sportsmen NWTF provides people with disabilities opportunities to enjoy the outdoors through local chapter events nationwide featuring activities such as hunting, fishing and shooting. Through this program, chapters host Wheelin' Sportsmen NWTF events across North America involving individuals with disabilities in the outdoors.

=== Women in the Outdoors ===
Women in the Outdoors is dedicated to providing hands-on outdoor education for women. Outdoor learning events, which allow women to try activities ranging from hunting to hiking, are conducted throughout the United States and Canada.

=== More Places to Hunt ===
More Places to Hunt is the NWTF program designed to help provide more land for hunters on both public and private land. The NWTF has already spent nearly $10 million and obtained more than 400,000 acres (1,600 km^{2}) of land for hunters since 1987. Widespread urban sprawl, changes in land ownership and tightened state agency and federal budgets have left hunters with far less private and public access to quality wildlife areas. Studies by the National Shooting Sports Foundation indicate that one of the top reasons hunters give up the sport is that they cannot find places to hunt. As hunter numbers decline, state agencies lose revenue used to support habitat and places to hunt. The NWTF is trying to reverse this trend through land purchases, conservation easements, legislative action and partnerships.

=== Television ===
The NWTF produces two television shows that can be seen on the Pursuit Channel:

- "Turkey Call" - is a fast-paced, magazine-style program with America's most popular game bird as the star of the show.
- "Get in the Game" - is a program that provides viewers with land management tips and secrets for attracting wildlife to their property.

"Primos Truth about Hunting"

=== Magazines ===
- Turkey Country - the flagship publication of the NWTF, is dedicated to everything from features and field research to updates on the latest products tailored to the turkey hunting enthusiast and conservationist.
- JAKES - dedicated to news and information of interest to young people.
- Xtreme JAKES - online magazine just for teens who enjoy the outdoors and hunting.

=== Online Media ===
- www.nwtf.org - the NWTF's resource for everything wild turkey on the World Wide Web. It features the latest NWTF local and national news, turkey hunting and calling tips; banquet, calling contest and shooting event information; audio clips of turkey sounds and information about the wild turkey. It also provides links to the NWTF outreach sites, message boards and the Turkey Shoppe, an online store featuring hunting gear, conservation literature and NWTF products and clothing.
- MyoutdoorTV.com - features on demand videos of classic NWTF TV shows 24 hours a day.

== See also ==
- Biodiversity
- Ecology
- Earth Science
- Natural environment
