= BoF =

BoF or BOF is an abbreviation for:

== Military ==
- Battle of Fredericksburg, American Civil War
- Second Battle of Fredericksburg, American Civil War
- Bangladesh Ordnance Factories

== Movies ==
- Balls of Fury, a comedy film
- Boys Over Flowers, a Japanese manga, TV, and movie series

== Organizations ==
- British Orienteering Federation, the United Kingdom sports body
- Bank of Finland, the Finnish central bank
- Bits of Freedom, a Dutch digital rights organization
- Bangladesh Ordnance Factories, the largest military industrial complex of the Bangladesh Army
- Business of Fashion, a fashion publication

== Technology ==
- Basic oxygen steelmaking, a furnace used in steel production
- Beginning of file, in computing - see end-of-file
- Breath of Fire, a video game series
- Buffer overflow, a type of exploit for certain software bugs
- Body-on-frame, an automobile construction technique
- Bag of features model in computer vision, an image representation method
- Birds of a feather (computing), informal discussion groups at technology and engineering conferences

== Other ==
- Battalions of Fear, the debut album of Blind Guardian
- Baptism of fire, English expression based on soldier's first experience under fire in battle
- Beurre, œuf, fromage, old French acronym for the food trade, known as "BOF" or "Les BOF"
- The Beauty of Fractals, book
- Brandy Old Fashioned, a modification of the Old fashioned cocktail

== See also ==
- Birds of a Feather (disambiguation)
