= Edward W. Stack =

American heir and businessman (born 1954/1955)

- Born: 1954 or 1955 (age 71–72)
- Education: St. John Fisher College (BAS, 1977)
- Years active: 1984–present
- Title: Executive Chairman and CMO of Dick's Sporting Goods
- Board member of: Greater Pittsburgh Chamber of Commerce; National Retail Federation
- Spouse: Donna A. Stack

Edward W. Stack (born 1954/1955) is an American billionaire businessman. In 1984, Stack took over as chairman and chief executive officer (CEO) of Dick's Sporting Goods, a sports equipment retailing company founded in 1948 by his father, Richard "Dick" Stack. In February 2021, he was succeeded as CEO by Lauren Hobart.

== Early life and education ==
Edward W. Stack is the son of Richard "Dick" Stack, who founded sports equipment retailer Dick's Sporting Goods in 1948. He grew up in the East Side neighborhood of Binghamton, New York, attended public schools, and played baseball and football at Binghamton North High School. Stack received a Bachelor of Arts and Science degree in accounting from St. John Fisher College in 1977. He planned to become a lawyer, but opted to help run the family business after his father's health declined.

== Career ==
Stack and his siblings purchased Dick's from their father in the early 1980s, when the company had two locations in Upstate New York. He became chairman and chief executive officer following his father's retirement in 1984. Stack established a board of directors, opened additional stores, and relocated the company's headquarters to Pittsburgh in 1994. He led the company during its initial public offering in 2002.

Stack owned approximately 25 percent of the company's common stock, and controlled nearly two-thirds of its voting shares, as of 2010. After selling 5.8 percent of his holdings in 2013, he owned around 20 percent of the company, primarily via Class B shares. Following the Stoneman Douglas High School shooting in February 2018, Stack announced that Dick's and its subsidiaries would stop selling military pattern semi-automatic rifles and high-capacity magazines, and would not sell firearms to people under the age of 21. In addition, Stack reported to destroy $5 million worth of assault-style-type rifles then in Dick's inventory. He has advocated for stronger gun control and worked to enact change by hiring lobbyists and meeting with politicians.

Stack is estimated to have a net worth of US$1.2 billion as of February 2018.

In February 2021, he was succeeded as CEO by Lauren Hobart.

=== Board service ===
Stack has served on the boards of the Greater Pittsburgh Chamber of Commerce, KeyCorp, the National Retail Federation, and Seton Hall University, as well as the advisory board of Wharton School of the University of Pennsylvania's Jay H. Baker Retailing Initiative.

== Recognition ==
In 1997, Stack ranked fourth in the "consumer-retailing/hardlines" category of magazine Institutional Investor's survey of the best chief American executives, and was named "Sports Executive Visionary of the Year" by magazine SportStyle. He was named "Entrepreneur of the Year in Southwestern Pennsylvania" by Ernst & Young in 1999. In 2005, Stack received a History Makers Award in the "business and industry" category from the Heinz History Center. He was inducted into the National Sporting Goods Association's Sporting Goods Industry Hall of Fame in 2006. Stack received a Humanity and Service Award from the Bus Stops Here Foundation in 2014, and a Major John H. Russell Leadership Award from Marine Corps University's foundation in 2015. He was given an honorary degree of doctor of humane letters from his alma mater, after delivering a commencement speech in 2016.

== Personal life ==
Stack is married to Donna A. Stack. In February 2015, the couple acquired an 8,946-square-foot home in North Palm Beach, Florida, for $12 million.
