= Chuck Taylor All-Stars =

Canvas and rubber shoes (sneakers)

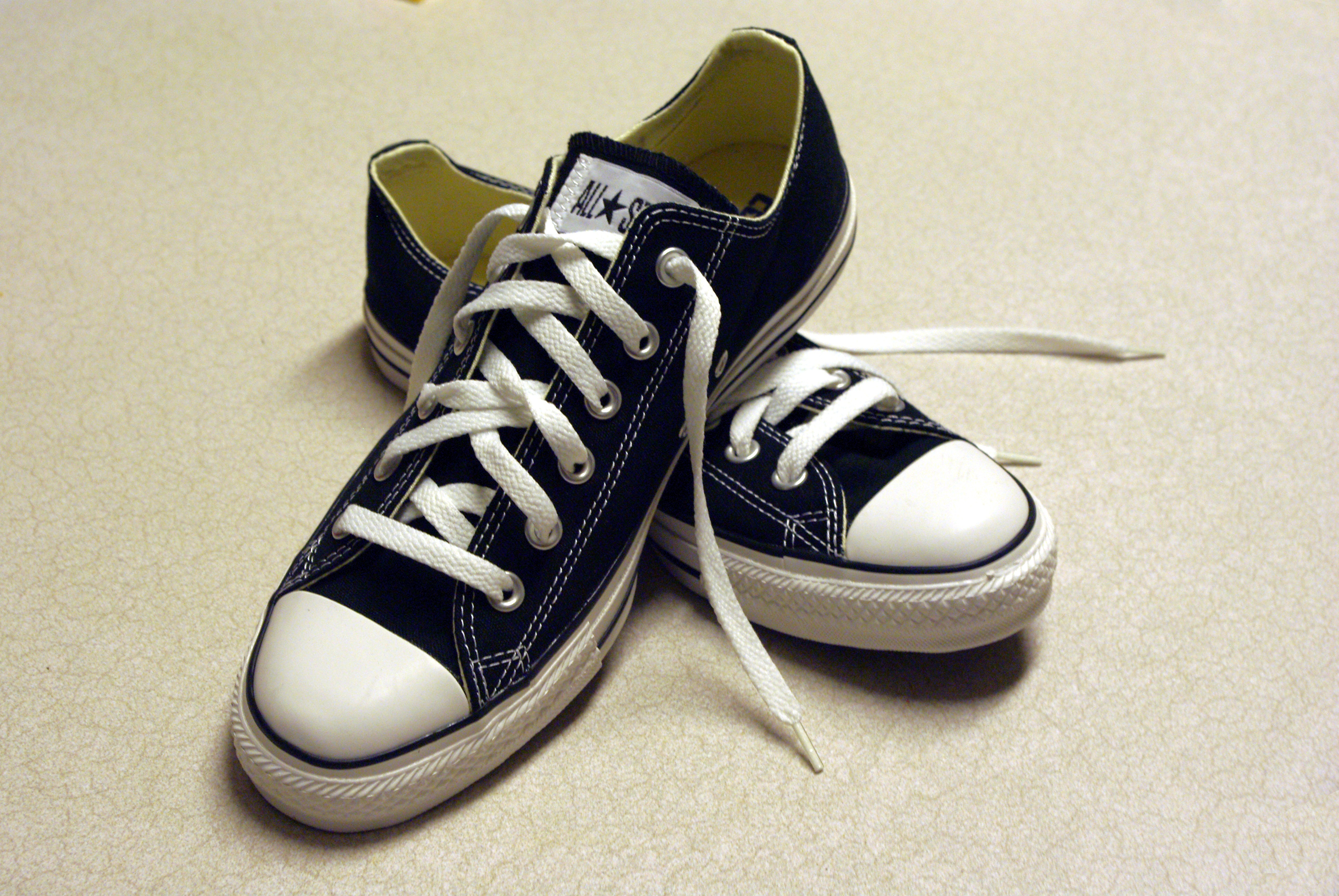
- A pair of Chuck Taylor All-Stars sneakers
- Type: Sneakers
- Inventor: Chuck Taylor; Converse
- Inception: 1917; 109 years ago ("Non-Skids" forerunner); 1922; 104 years ago ("Chuck Taylor All Stars")
- Manufacturer: Converse (brand)
- Website: Converse.com

Chuck Taylor All-Stars or Converse All Stars (also referred to as "Converse", "Chuck Taylors", "Chucks", "Chuckys", "Cons", "All Stars", and "Chucky Ts") are sneakers manufactured by American fashion brand Converse (a subsidiary of Nike, Inc. since 2003). Initially developed as a basketball shoe in the early 20th century, its design has remained largely unchanged since its introduction. The shoe consists of a stitched upper portion, and a toe cap and outsole usually made of rubber. Although Chuck Taylors are made of various materials such as leather or suede, the original and most widely known version is made from cotton canvas. The innovative detail of the original shoe was the "loose lining" of soft canvas that was intended to provide flexibility and prevent blisters.

Converse started making an early basketball shoe in 1917 and redesigned it in 1922, when Chuck Taylor asked the company to create a better shoe with more support and flexibility. After Converse added Taylor's signature to the ankle patch they became known as Chuck Taylor All Stars. By the 1960s the company had captured about 70 to 80 percent of the basketball shoe market, but the shoe declined in popularity during the 1970s when basketball players wore competing brands. Chuck Taylor All Stars enjoyed a comeback in popularity in the 1980s as retro-style casual footwear.

Although Chuck Taylor All-Stars are no longer used in professional basketball, they remain popular as casual footwear. Converse has released editions of the shoes in many colors and patterns, as well as updated models that retain the original's appearance while incorporating newer technology.

== History ==
=== Early years ===
Ad from 1920 for the forerunner of the Chuck Taylor All Star Converse "Non-Skids"

Marquis Mills Converse founded the Converse Rubber Shoe Company in 1908 in Malden, Massachusetts. In 1917 the company designed the forerunner of the modern All Star shoe that it marketed under the name of "Non-Skids". The shoe was composed of a rubber sole and canvas upper and was designed for basketball players.

In 1921, Charles "Chuck" Taylor, an American semi-professional basketball player for the Akron Firestone Non-Skids, joined Converse as a salesman. Within a year of Taylor's arrival, the company had adopted his ideas for improvements to the shoe's design to enhance its flexibility and ankle support. The restyled shoe also incorporated a distinctive All-Star logo on the circular patch that protected the ankle. After Taylor's signature was added to the ankle patch as his endorsement, they became known as Chuck Taylor All Stars, the first celebrity-endorsed athletic shoe.

To promote sales of Converse All Star shoes to basketball players, Taylor held basketball clinics in high school and college gyms and YMCAs all across the United States and taught the fundamentals of the game. During the 1926–27 season Taylor also served as a player-manager of the company-sponsored basketball team called the Converse All Stars. The Chicago-based touring team was established to promote sales of the company's All Star basketball shoes.

Numerous professional basketball players were soon wearing All Stars. Converse All Stars were the official shoe of the Olympics from 1936 to 1968. During World War II All Stars were the official athletic training shoes of the U.S. armed forces.

=== Post World War II popularity ===
By the 1950s, Chuck Taylor All Stars had become a standard among high school, collegiate, and professional basketball players.

In the 1960s, Converse had captured about 70 to 80 percent of the basketball shoe market, with Converse Chuck Taylor All Stars being worn by ninety percent of professional and college basketball players. Due in large part to the sale of its All Stars, the company began to expand and open more factories.

Converse began to struggle financially during the 1970s, due to competition and poor business decisions as the shoe lost its popularity among basketball players. Many athletes switched to shoes with leather uppers and harder rubber soles made by Converse as well as its competitors. Tree Rollins was thought to be the last player to regularly wear canvas Converse All Stars in the NBA during the 1979–1980 season, although Micheal Ray Richardson and Mickey Johnson briefly wore leather All Stars with the New Jersey Nets after 1982.

Chuck Taylor All Stars regained popularity in the 1980s and 1990s, making a shift to casual, retro-style footwear. The athletic shoe evolved into the shoe of choice and a favorite for subcultures, particularly artists and musicians. By 2000 Converse had sold more than 600 million pairs of All Stars during its eighty years of manufacturing them.

=== Nike acquisition ===
While Converse dominated the U.S. basketball shoe market from the 1920s until the 1970s, it began to struggle in the late 1970s due to competition, poor business decision-making, and lack of funds. In subsequent years Converse filed for bankruptcy multiple times and fell into further debt. Nike acquired Converse in 2003 for an estimated $305 million and continues to market Chuck Taylor All Stars.

Converse's manufacturing operations for Chuck Taylor All Stars, as well as the company's other shoes, was moved from the United States to other countries such as China, India, Vietnam and Indonesia.

=== Lawsuit ===
In October 2014, after years of sending unsuccessful cease and desist letters, Converse filed a lawsuit against 31 companies for allegedly infringing on its sneaker style's bumper toe, striped midsole, and toe cap. The brand argued that these companies were violating a common-law trademark by importing "knockoff" sneakers with similar elements. The list included shoe brands by major retailers, including Walmart, Skechers, Ed Hardy, Ralph Lauren and Fila. A number of companies settled with Converse and were dropped from the list.

In November 2015, Charles Bullock, chief administrative judge at the International Trade Commission, preliminarily ruled that several brands Converse filed against were violating Converse's outsole design trademarks, i.e. the pattern on the bottom of the sole of the shoe. Judge Bullock further ruled that while Skechers "Twinkle Toes" brands did share similarities to Converse, "Twinkle Toes" were different enough and marketed in a way to not be mistaken for Chuck Taylor All-Stars. Judge Bullock also ruled that most of the shoes sold by Highline United under the Ash brand did not infringe and that Converse did not have a valid common law mark for its midsole.

On June 23, 2016, the International Trade Commission ruled that Converse's alleged trade dress for the midsole design of a combined toe cap, toe bumper, and stripe was not entitled to trademark protection under the common law and found invalid Converse's federal trademark registration.

== Design ==
=== Early styles ===
When first designed in the early decades of the twentieth century, the Converse All Star had three main styles: a monochromatic shoe with a black canvas upper and black rubber soles, an all-white, high-top model with blue and red trim (designed for the 1936 Olympic Games), and an all black leather and rubber shoe.

By 1923 the Converse All Star shoe was designed in its present-day form after the company made improvements to the design based on Chuck Taylor's input. The restyled Converse All Star basketball shoe also had a distinctive five-pointed-star logo displayed on the high-top shoe's ankle patch. In addition, Taylor's signature was incorporated into the high-top's ankle patch, resulting in the design that became known as the Chuck Taylor All Star.

In 1949, Converse made a black-and-white version of the All Star. In 1957, it introduced the low-cut "Oxford"-style version of the shoe, and in time the company began to produce All Stars in multiple colors and prints. Today, Converse makes the Chuck Taylor All Star in a variety of colors, styles, prints and fabrics.

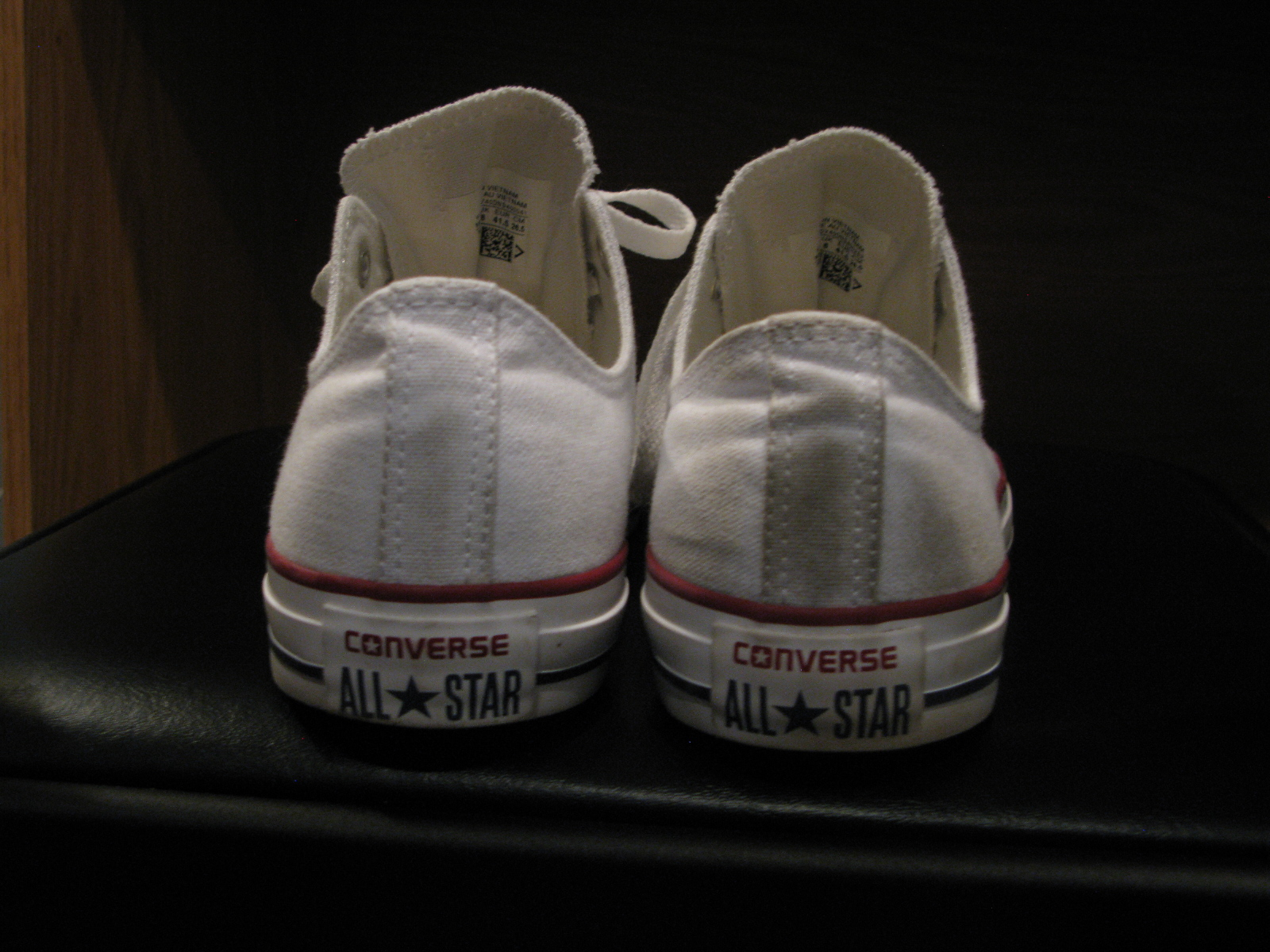
A pair of white low-cut All Star sneakers, showing the current back heel logo

Only the high-cut shoe design features the ankle patch with the All Star logo, but the heel of the shoe's high- and low-cut designs include a glued-on label with an "ALL★STAR" logo. The low-cut shoes also have a tag with the same logo as the heel stitched onto the tongue. In 2013 the logo appearing on the heel and tongue was slightly altered to include "CONVERSE" in addition to "ALL★STAR", but the ankle patches of the high-cut shoes remained unchanged.

=== Chuck Taylor All Star '70 ===
In 2013, Converse launched the Chuck Taylor All Star '70, which featured a build similar to the All Stars used for basketball games built in the late 1960s and early 1970s. This retro model differed from the then-current Chuck Taylor All Stars, as various changes happened to the All Star shoes over the intervening three decades. The '70 model featured thicker canvas, a higher rubber midsole and foxing, thicker cushioning, a smaller toe cap, extra material that was stitched on the side wall behind the toe cap for reinforcement, a one-piece rubber bottom sole versus the three piece sole on the modern All Stars, and a black heel patch versus a white one on the modern All Star.

=== Chuck Taylor All Star II ===
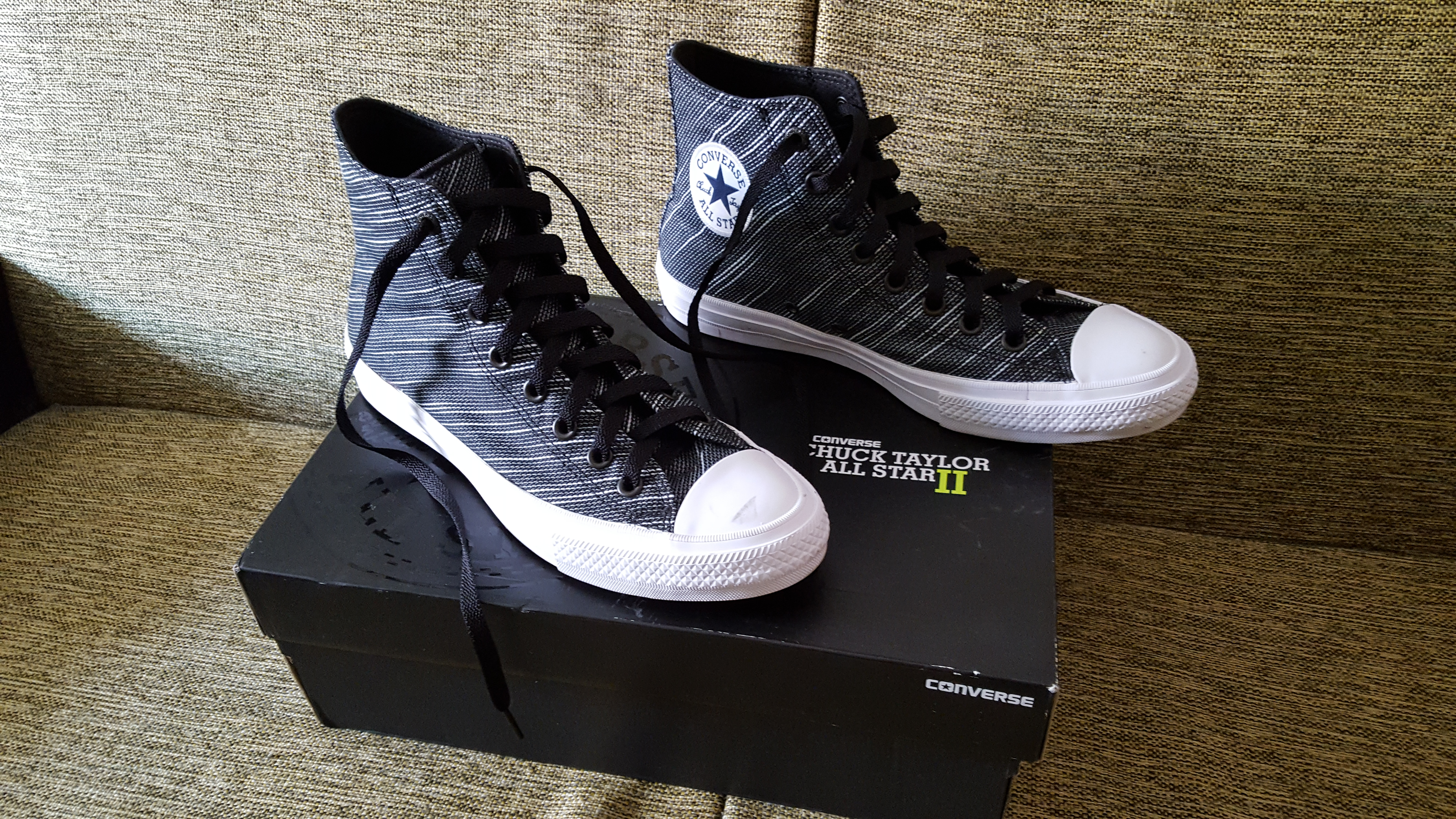
Chuck II with knit canvas

On July 28, 2015, Converse released the Chuck Taylor All Star II. This shoe differed from the standard, modern version of the Chuck Taylor All Star in several ways, including a thicker canvas; a higher rubber midsole and foxing that was similar in size to the All Star '70, but it had lighter weight rubber; a thicker Lunarlon cushioning; a slightly smaller toe cap; two elastic bands at the base of the tongue, to avoid slippage to the sides; a sewn-on ankle patch on the high-tops; a two-piece rubber bottom sole versus the three piece sole on the modern All Stars; a heel patch with 3D letters versus a flat one on the modern All Star version.

A few months after the release of the Chuck II, several special series were released with different canvas textures such as the Chuck II Knit, the Chuck II Shield Canvas, and the Chuck II Rio Open Knit, to celebrate the Rio Olympics. A year after the release, the Chuck II was considered a commercial failure, with retailers reporting poor sales.

=== Converse Modern ===
In June 2016, Converse launched a new line of sneakers designed by Hiroshi Fujiwara, Tinker Hatfield, and Mark Parker. A high- and low-top range had initial color offerings in blue, red, green, black, and white. A luxe range in patent leather was also planned. These shoes took more liberties with the Chuck Taylor design than the Chuck II, and the metal grommets and rubber toecap were removed. Nike technology included a circular knit upper with a shiny finish, a cushioned foam rubber sole similar to the Air Jordans, a neoprene tongue, and a TPU-fused toecap.

=== Special editions ===
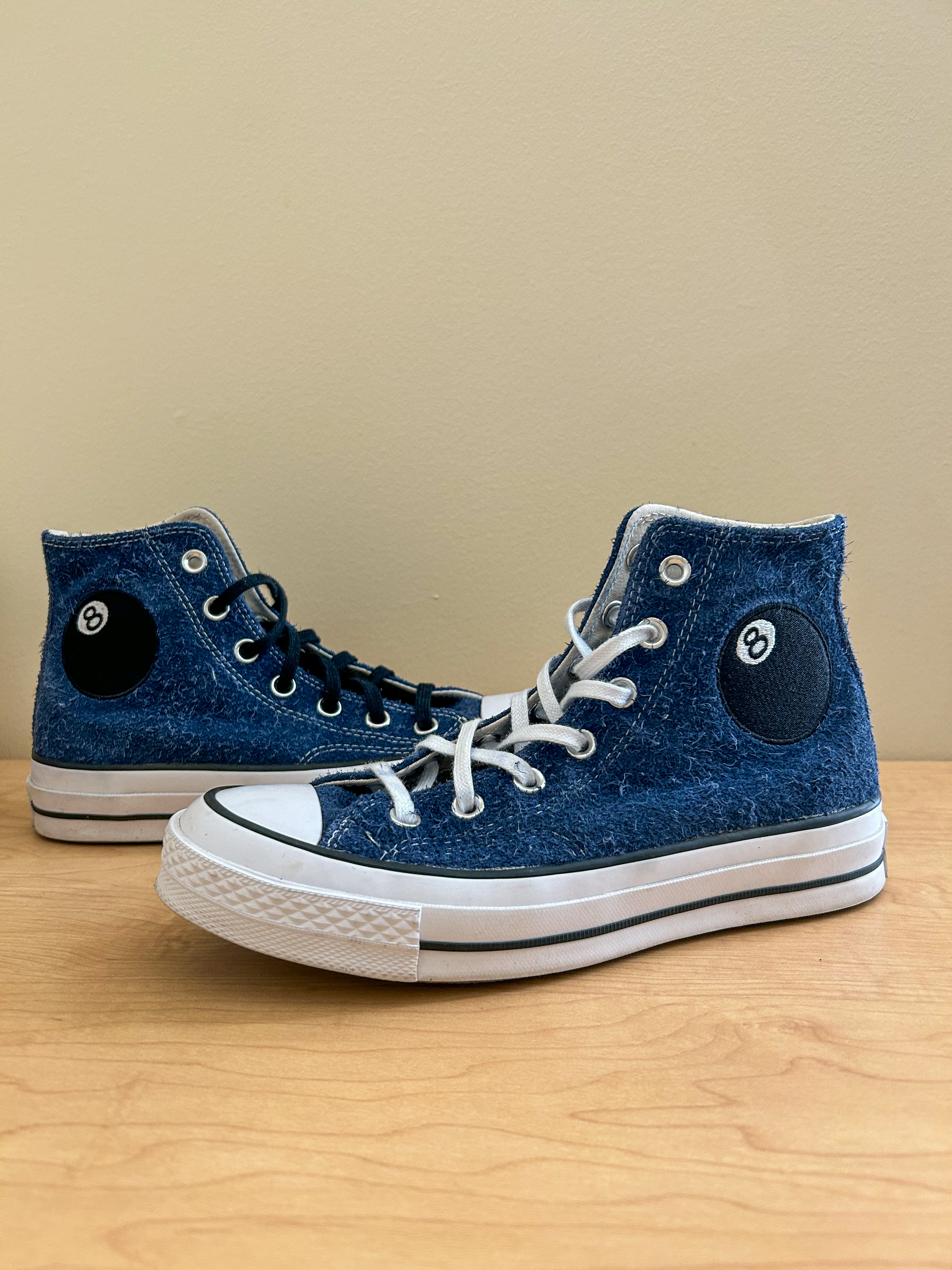
Converse X Stüssy

Converse has released many special editions of Chuck Taylor All-Stars, including DC Comics, Super Mario, Pink Floyd, AC/DC, Metallica, The Ramones, The Clash, Dr. Seuss, Sailor Jerry, Grateful Dead, Ozzy Osbourne, Jimi Hendrix, Miley Cyrus, Drew Brophy, Nirvana, Bad Meets Evil, Green Day, Gorillaz, Matt and Kim, Black Sabbath, the Who, and Dungeons & Dragons.

== Sociocultural impact ==
Although Chuck Taylor All-Stars had vanished from the professional basketball scene by 1979, they continued to flourish in popular culture and fashion as casual footwear. Chuck Taylors have played a role in several subcultures, which the company has promoted as part of the brand's ongoing cultural popularity. In addition, Chuck Taylor All-Stars have been portrayed in film, art, and music culture, as well as some sports subcultures such as powerlifting and skateboarding.

Chuck Taylors are culturally associated with authenticity. They were popularized by James Dean for rebels and outcasts. They were also associated with Andy Warhol, Kurt Cobain, and Karl Lagerfeld.

While campaigning with running mate and future President Joe Biden in 2020, then-California senator Kamala Harris made a fashion statement by wearing Chuck Taylors as a substitute for high heels at their public appearances. She continued wearing them during her 2024 campaign.

=== Film and television ===
Chuck Taylor All Star shoes have been worn by actors in feature films that include Jerry Lewis in The Colgate Comedy Hour (early 1950s), Elvis Presley in Change of Habit (1969), Sylvester Stallone in Rocky (1976), several cast members of Animal House (1978), basketball players in Grease (1978), Tom Hanks in Bachelor Party (1984), Michael J. Fox in Back to the Future (1985), the cast members of Hoosiers (1986), Mike Myers and Dana Carvey in Wayne's World (1992), and Will Smith in I, Robot (2004). The video dust jacket of Hoosiers also featured the black high-tops.

The cast of several popular network television series such as Dennis the Menace (1959–64), M*A*S*H (1972–83), Happy Days (1974–84) and The A-Team (1983–87) have worn Converse All Star shoes. Wally and Beaver are seen wearing Converse as they climb a ladder in a 1958 episode (S1E18) of the MCA TV show Leave It to Beaver. Opie Taylor (Ron Howard) wore Chuck Taylor high tops in season 4 episode 9 of the Andy Griffith Show which first aired on 11/25/1963. They are also prominent in many Chuck Lorre sitcoms, being the primary sneakers worn by Leonard Hofstadter from The Big Bang Theory and Christy Plunkett from Mom. David Tennant wore the footwear during his tenure as the Tenth Doctor on the BBC sci-fi series Doctor Who. Pauline Quirk's character Sharon, from the UK comedy Birds of a Feather was also known to wear them throughout the original 9 series.

=== Art ===
In 2015, Converse released the Converse All-Star Andy Warhol collection, in partnership with the Andy Warhol Foundation. In honor of Warhol's contributions to visual art, Converse designed the All-Star shoe to commemorate Warhol's subcultural influence. Since 2018, sculptor Michael Leavitt has formatted long-running projects for art students and craftspeople to make a do-it-yourself Converse Chuck Taylor cardboard shoe.

=== Powerlifting ===
Although originally intended for basketball, powerlifting athletes have embraced Chuck Taylors as ideal shoes with flat rubber soles that enforce correct posture on movements such as deadlifts, squats, and bench presses. Seventy-one-year-old Pete Bennett set a world record for the squat in his age class at 465 pounds (211 kg) in a pair of Chuck Taylors. The canvas material allows powerlifters to push their feet to the outside on squats which helps keep their knees out and activates their glutes. The low-top Chuck Taylors provide complete ankle mobility, as the canvas does not cover the ankles.

== See also ==
- List of basketball shoe brands
- Sneaker tossing
