= Sporting Goods Industry Hall of Fame =

Industry hall of fame

The Sporting Goods Industry Hall of Fame is an award for members of the American National Sporting Goods Association, an industry trade group for the sports equipment industry.

== Inductees ==
As of the 2023 awards, 181 people are listed in the Hall of Fame, approximately 10 of whom are female.

Notable inductees include Chuck Taylor in 1958, Howard Head in 1965, Adi Dassler in 1978, Frank Lowy in 1983, William Modell in 1994, Johnny Morris in 1998, Jake Burton Carpenter in 2003, Gert Boyle in 2003, Phil Knight in 2004, Richard Cabela in 2005, Edward W. Stack in 2006, Randy Renfrow and Augie Nieto in 2008, Norbert Olberz in 2009, John Forzani in 2010, Cliff Keen in 2012, Kevin Plank in 2017 and Klaus Obermeyer in 2020.
