= Public Lands (retailer) =

American outdoor goods retailer

- Company type: Subsidiary
- Industry: Retail
- Founded: August 16, 2013; 12 years ago Cranberry Township, Pennsylvania, U.S.
- Headquarters: Moon Township, Pennsylvania, U.S.
- Number of locations: 3 (2026)
- Area served: United States
- Products: Hunting; fishing; Outdoor merchandise
- Parent: Dick's Sporting Goods (2013–2025)

Public Lands is a retailer of hunting, fishing, camping, and related outdoor recreation merchandise that is a subsidiary of Dick's Sporting Goods. The brand began operations as "Field and Stream," and the company's original logo date of "1871" referenced the origination of Gordon & Ferguson Merchandising Company, who sold clothing under the brand "Field and Stream" starting in 1915. Dick's purchased licensing rights to the name from Gordon and Ferguson's successors in 2012.

In 2021, Dick's began the converting existing Field & Stream stores to Public Lands stores, which are similar to in concept, but with an increased emphasis on local conservation efforts and preservation of public lands along with a decreased emphasis on hunting and firearms.

== History ==
On August 16, 2013, Dick's Sporting Goods opened its first Field & Stream Shop in Cranberry Township, Pennsylvania, at the site of the former Dick's location in Cranberry (Dick's had moved to a newer location nearby in Cranberry Township in 2012), operating as a competitor to Cabela's. Willie Robertson of the reality television series Duck Dynasty made a speaking appearance at a wedding at the store, with both participants dressed in camouflage, as well as retired WWE wrestler Shawn Michaels (currently hosting MacMillan River Adventures on the Outdoor Channel) appearing at the store to sign autographs for the grand opening. Later in the month, the store began selling AR-15 semi-automatic rifles, ending the chain's 2012 self-imposed suspension of sales of certain semi-automatic firearms following the Sandy Hook Elementary School shooting.

The first locations opened after the Cranberry store were in Erie, Pennsylvania (on the site of a proposed Cabela's store that Dick's had purchased before Cabela's had a chance to buy it), Altoona, Pennsylvania, and Crescent Springs, Kentucky. On October 10, 2014, a newly constructed Field & Stream Shop opened in Miamisburg, Ohio, and Horseheads, New York. The Miamisburg store opened its doors on October 8, 2014, although the official opening was not until October 10, 2014. As of 2026, the chain has 4 stores across the United States, including stores as far west as Texas.

In October 2019, the Utah based company Sportsman's Warehouse acquired eight Field & Stream stores. In March 2020, the company acquired two additional stores.

In 2021, the original Field & Stream store in Cranberry Township was replaced by Dick's newest concept called Public Lands, which is similar to Field & Stream in concept but placed emphasis on local conservation efforts. Additional Public Lands locations were located in Melville, New York; Framingham, Massachusetts; Columbus, Ohio; Charlottesville, Virginia; Kennesaw, Georgia; Woodbury, Minnesota; and Medford, Oregon. However, by October 2024, it was reported that Dicks planned to close many of the Public Lands locations, with many of them being converted to Dicks House of Sport or Dicks Sporting Goods locations.

In 2024, Dick's Sporting Goods sold the rights to Field & Stream name on retail to Field & Stream magazine. As of December 2025, three Public Lands locations remain.
