= Birds of a Feather =

Birds of a Feather may refer to:

== Film ==
- Birds of a Feather (1917 film), a film starring Harold Lloyd
- Birds of a Feather (1931 film), Walt Disney Silly Symphony animated short
- Birds of a Feather (1936 film), a British comedy directed by John Baxter
- Birds of a Feather (2019 film), a German animated adventure film
- Birds of a Feather (2011 film), a comedy film written and directed by Anthony Meindl

== Literature ==
- Birds of a Feather, a 1961 novel by Nigel Tranter
- Birds of a Feather: Unpublished Letters of W.H. Hudson, a 1981 non-fiction book attributed to William Henry Hudson, edited by D. Shrubsall
- Birds of a Feather, a 1985 novel by Victor Canning
- Birds of a Feather, a 1985 novel by Peggy Webb
- Birds of a Feather, a 1985 novel by Linda Randall Wisdom
- Birds of a Feather, a 2004 novel by Jacqueline Winspear

== Television ==
- Birds of a Feather (TV series), British television sitcom 1989–1998, 2014–2020
- "Birds of a Feather", Batman: The Animated Series season 1, episode 52 (1993)
- "Birds of a Feather", Ben 10: Alien Force season 2, episode 10 (2009)
- "Birds of a Feather", Breadwinners season 1, episode 20 (2015)
- "Birds of a Feather", Captain Planet and the Planeteers season 2, episode 16 (1992)
- "Birds of a Feather", Comedy Connections series 2, episode 2 (2004)
- "Birds of a Feather", Counterpart season 1, episode 2 (2018)
- "Birds of a Feather", Esme & Roy season 1, episode 10a (2018)
- "Birds of a Feather", Far Out Space Nuts season 1, episode 8 (1975)
- "Birds of a Feather", Have Gun – Will Travel season 1, episode 26 (1958)
- "Birds of a Feather", Highway to Heaven season 2, episode 6 (1985)
- "Birds of a Feather", Inspector Gadget (1983) season 1, episode 60 (1983)
- "Birds of a Feather", It Takes a Thief (1968) season 1, episode 10 (1968)
- "Birds of a Feather", Jake and the Never Land Pirates season 1, episode 18a (2011)
- "Birds of a Feather", Kim's Convenience season 4, episode 11 (2020)
- "Birds of a Feather…", Lavender Castle episode 26 (2000)
- "Birds of a Feather", Mickey Mouse Funhouse season 2, episode 9a (2023)
- "Birds of a Feather", Mighty Morphin Power Rangers season 1, episode 36 (1993)
- "Birds of a Feather", Murder, She Wrote season 1, episode 3 (1984)
- "Birds of a Feather", My Little Pony Tales episode 19 (1992)
- "Birds of a Feather", NCIS season 19, episode 21 (2022)
- "Birds of a Feather", Northern Exposure season 5, episode 6 (1993)
- "Birds of a Feather", Peep and the Big Wide World season 1, episode 15a (2004)
- "Birds of a Feather", Resident Alien season 1, episode 4 (2021)
- "Birds of a Feather", She-Ra: Princess of Power season 1, episode 48 (1985)
- "Birds of a Feather...", Southern Charm season 3, episode 4 (2016)
- "Birds of a Feather", Starsky & Hutch season 4, episode 15 (1979)
- "Birds of a Feather", Street Legal season 1, episode 1 (1987)
- "Birds of a Feather", The Adventures of the Galaxy Rangers episode 28 (1986)
- "Birds of a Feather", The Crow: Stairway to Heaven episode 15 (1999)
- "Birds of a Feather", The Dresden Files episode 1 (2007)
- "Birds of a Feather", The Exile episode 7 (1991)
- "Birds of a Feather", The Middle season 7, episode 12 (2016)
- "Birds of a Feather", Thomas & Sarah episode 1 (1979)
- "Birds of a Feather", The Tom and Jerry Show (2014) season 1, episode 7a (2014)
- "Birds of a Feather", Where on Earth Is Carmen Sandiego? season 3, episode 4 (1995)
- "Birds of a Feather", Wizard Wars season 1, episode 6 (2014)

== Music ==
=== Band ===
- Birds of a Feather (British band), early name of group later known as The Chanter Sisters
- Birds of a Feather, a jazz group, with an eponymous 1987 album, produced by Dan Siegel

=== Albums ===
- Birds of a Feather (Carmen McRae album), 1958
- Birds of a Feather (Roy Haynes album), 2001
- Birds of a Feather or the title song, by Rough Trade, 1985

=== Songs ===
- "Birds of a Feather" (Joe South song), 1968; covered by the Raiders, 1971
- "Birds of a Feather" (Killing Joke song), 1982
- "Birds of a Feather" (Phish song), 1998
- "Birds of a Feather" (Billie Eilish song), 2024
- "Birds of a Feather", a song by May Jailer (Lana Del Rey), from her demo album Sirens, 2006
- "Birds of a Feather", a song by Cliff Richard and Peabo Bryson, from Richard's album Soulicious, 2011

== Other uses ==
- Birds of a feather (computing), in the Internet Engineering Task Force, an informal discussion group or session
- Birds of a Feather, a 2004 Maisie Dobbs novel by Jacqueline Winspear
- "Birds of a Feather" an Electron Rocket launch for the NRO
- Birds of a Feather, a 2012 photograph series by Claire Rosen

== See also ==
- "Birds of a feather flock together", an English proverb
- Bentvueghels (lit. "Birds of a Feather"), a group of Dutch and Flemish artists active in 17th-century Rome
- Homophily, the tendency of individuals to associate with similar others
- Birds of a Father, a 1961 Looney Tunes cartoon
- "Lele pū nā manu like" (lit. "Birds of a Feather"), an episode of Hawaii Five-0
