= Cliff Keen =

American wrestler and coach (1901–1991)

Biographical details
- Born: June 13, 1901; Roger Mills County, Oklahoma, U.S.
- Died: November 4, 1991 (aged 90); Ann Arbor, Michigan, U.S.
- Education: Oklahoma A&M

Playing career
- 1920–1924: Oklahoma A&M

Coaching career (HC unless noted)
- 1925–1970: Michigan Wolverines

Head coaching record
- Overall: 267-91-10 (Wrestling)

Accomplishments and honors

Championships
- 13x Big Ten Conference (1927, 1928, 1929, 1930, 1938, 1944, 1953, 1955, 1956, 1960, 1963, 1964, 1965)

Awards
- National Wrestling Hall of Fame Distinguished Member (1976); Helms Hall of Fame (1958); University of Michigan Athletic Hall of Honor (1980); Sporting Goods Industry Hall of Fame (2011)

Clifford Patrick Keen (June 13, 1901 – November 4, 1991) was an American coach who served as the head coach of the University of Michigan collegiate wrestling team from 1925 to 1970. He led the Michigan Wolverines to 13 Big Ten Conference championships, and coached 68 All-American wrestlers. In 1976, he was inducted into the inaugural class of the National Wrestling Hall of Fame as a Distinguished Member.

== Early life and college ==
Keen was born on a ranch at Red Moon in Roger Mills County, Oklahoma, near the town of Cheyenne. His high school in Weatherford, Oklahoma had no wrestling team; one of his high school classmates was Arnold "Swede" Umbach. He was playing basketball one day when a wrestler asked him if he could help as a partner so he could practice his moves; after Keen was beaten by the much smaller man, he decided to go out for the wrestling team. He got his start in wrestling as a middleweight at Oklahoma A&M (now Oklahoma State University–Stillwater), where he became a three time Missouri Valley Conference Champion.

Keen was undefeated as a collegiate wrestler at 158 lbs, but was defeated by Leon Gorman of Texas at 175 lbs when Gallagher asked him to wrestle a second bout in a dual meet after winning his previous bout. At that time, there was no scoring, wrestlers won bouts on riding time or by pin; each of the three periods wrestled was 7 minutes per period, and some bouts went 30 minutes. His wrestling coach at Oklahoma A&M was Edward C. Gallagher. Keen was also a lineman for the Oklahoma A&M football team coached by Michigan All-American John Maulbetsch, and a sprinter on the track team also coached by Gallagher. He was named to the 1924 Olympic team, but did not compete because of a broken rib; Keen had wins over two wrestlers on the team, Guy Lookabaugh and Orion Stuteville.

Keen graduated from Oklahoma A&M in 1924 with a major in salesmanship; he also was business manager of "The Orange and Black, " the school newspaper where he met sports editor, Jess Hoke. His brother, Paul, was also on the football team, and was captain of the basketball team; however, he also learned wrestling from Gallagher and coached at Warner, Yale, and Geary High Schools. Gallagher initiated the Oklahoma State High School Wrestling Championships in 1922. Paul earned a master's degree at the University of Michigan in 1944, and became the intramural director at the University of Oklahoma, where he coached wrestling, 1927–1936. Paul also was twice elected Mayor of Norman. Both Cliff and Paul are the only two brothers to be named as U.S. Olympic Wrestling Coaches in 1948 and 1940. Keen met his wife, Mildred, at Oklahoma A&M; she was a High School State Champion in Tennis.

Keen started his coaching career in 1924 as a high school football coach in Frederick, Oklahoma where he earned $175 a month for teaching social studies and coaching football, basketball, baseball, and wrestling; Mildred also taught at Frederick. Keen's 1925 team outscored opponents 355 to 3. Fielding Yost hired Keen for an annual salary of $3,000 on the recommendation of his football coach, John Maulbetsch.

== Coaching career at Michigan ==
Cliff Keen, U-M wrestling coach, 1925–1970

Newspaper profile on Cliff Keen Ironwood Globe, March 1939

After coaching high school in Oklahoma for two years, Keen took a job at Michigan as the wrestling coach and assistant football coach. His teams won Big Ten championships in 1927, 1928, 1929, 1930 and 1938, and five of his teams in his first 12 years went through their seasons with a single defeat. One of his first great wrestlers was Ed Don George, who later became the world's heavyweight champion. Another one of his outstanding wrestlers on his 1938 team, Harold Nichols, went on to become one of the greatest coaches in NCAA Wrestling History after coaching at Iowa State, 1954–1985. Other pupils, Frank Bissell at The Hill School, Larry Nelson at Vacaville (CA), and Mike Rodriquez at Detroit Catholic Central all went on to be recognized as some of the greatest high school coaches in the United States. Bissell sent over 20 of his finest wrestlers to Keen to wrestle for Michigan from late 1940s through 1970 including his own son.

As the wrestling coach at the University of Michigan from 1925 to 1970, Coach Keen led the teams to a record of 268 wins, 91 losses, 9 ties and 13 Big Ten Conference wrestling championships. His teams placed in the top three in the Big Ten 40 times. His wrestlers captured 19 National titles (NCAA and AAU) and 81 conference crowns. In his 45 years at Michigan, he coached 68 All-Americans as well as 81 Big Ten champions. His teams went undefeated for four years, 1962–1966, winning 34 consecutive matches and 55 of 56 matches until 1968. After coaching five decades, Keen's record was 97-11-2 in his final decade of coaching, 1960–1969, before retiring in 1970; his squads won Big Ten Championships in 1960, 1963, 1964, and 1965 and were NCAA Runner-Up in 1967. Like all the wrestling coaches in his era, he was unable to offer any of his "boys" a scholarship until the mid-1960s; he was unable to recruit, and the only financial assistance he could offer was to get them a job on campus to support their tuition and room&board. The lack of financial support prevented Keen from taking at least 75 of his wrestlers to the NCAA Championships although they qualified; he was unable to field a full squad at every weight until 1963.

His length of service as Michigan's wrestling coach was “the longest tenure of any coach in any sport in NCAA history.”

He obtained a law degree from Michigan in 1933. Keen later said he had never intended to make a career of coaching, but wanted to go into law. He said: “I never intended to continue at coaching when I got my law degree here. But that was the depths of the depression and I needed a job. I kept saying I'd coach one more year. . . . I never expected it to last 45 years.” Asked at the time of his retirement from coaching in 1970 if he would finally open his law practice, Keen joked, “I'm going into the full practice of retiring, I think.” He took three years off from coaching to serve as a Naval Commander during World War II. “When I came out of the service I definitely, positively decided I had to start my law practice, but Fritz Crisler persuaded me to keep coaching.” The military leave of absence from 1942 to 1945 still counted as years of service at the University of Michigan.

Keen was a firm believer in wrestling as a means to build character. He once said: “I believe that wrestling plays a highly educational part in the development of a boy. The fundamental that every successful wrestler must acquire, and which has great carry-over value after his student days, is self-discipline. From self-discipline stems self-confidence and belief in one's self. What greater lesson can a sport or a coach impart?"

Keen and his good friend, Fendley Collins, who was also an Oklahoma A&M grad, initiated the Michigan State High School Wrestling Championships in 1939 with only 8 teams; they took turns hosting the events at their universities until the 1967 when there were so many high school programs with wrestling that Class C-D wrestling events began after Class B had adopted in 1961. It was too much for two men to manage, and Collins retired in 1962 after coaching at Michigan State since 1930. When the two men began their coaching careers at Michigan and Michigan State in 1925 and 1930, they used to referee many of each other's home matches.

Keen later recalled that one of the greatest moments of his career came in 1965, when his team threw a big surprise for him after the Big Ten meet. More than 200 of his former wrestlers attended, including the entire 1928 team that won the Big Ten championship. Keen said, “I take a lot of pride in what these fellows have done, not only in wrestling, but later. They've been pretty successful in a number of things and the list reads like a 'Who's Who.' Whenever I think of that I get a lot of pride and satisfaction.”

Keen also spent 33 years as an assistant football coach with the Wolverines, 1926–1958, serving under head coaches Fielding H. Yost, Tad Wieman, Harry Kipke, Fritz Crisler and Bennie Oosterbaan. He coached Michigan's 150 lbs. Lightweight Football Team to two conference championships in 1947 and 1948; his 1948 team defeated Ohio State twice in the same season, the only Wolverine football team to accomplish this. His volunteer assistant coach for his 1947 team was George Allen, and his 1948 quarterback was Jerry Burns; both would later become NFL Head Football Coaches. During Gerald Ford's football career at Michigan, from 1932 to 1934, Keen coached Ford as the center on the offensive unit. In fact, Ford considered Keen “his coach” and maintained a friendship with Keen throughout his life.

When Keen retired in 1970, the Associated Press reported: “Cliff Keen could have spent a career wrestling with law books. But instead he decided that wrestling itself was his ambition. That was back in 1925. Calvin Coolidge was president. Booze was illegal. Alexander J. Groesbeck was the governor of Michigan. And Cliff Keen became the University of Michigan wrestling coach. Forty-five years? How could anyone be a wrestling coach for 45 years.”

== Olympics and wrestling innovator ==
Keen also served on the U.S. Olympic Committee from 1928 to 1952 and was manager of the 1948 Olympic team in London. Keen was the first University of Michigan Head Coach named officially as an Olympic Coach in 1948. He was an original member and later president of the National Wrestling Coaches Association and also presided over the national rules committee.

For many years Keen pioneered the development of safe, effective, wrestling equipment such as the Cliff Keen head guard that bears his name. He is credited with developing the wrestling headgear used to protect wrestlers from head and ear injuries. And in 1955, Keen developed a new circular wrestling ring. At the time of its introduction, the Associated Press reported: “Michigan wrestling coach Cliff Keen saw his brainchild take shape this season – a circular wrestling ring. He has great hopes for it.” The principle behind Keen's round ring was to eliminate the corners. Keen felt it was too easy for a wrestler to reach for the edge of the ring and pull himself out. The corners also restricted movement and made it difficult to maneuver from a corner, because a shift in either direction would put one or the other out of the ring. Keen explained that the square ring was of “mechanical history.” With the ropes used in the 1930s, a square ring was needed because the ropes had to be anchored by posts. With the ropes gone from collegiate wrestling, Keen concluded it was time to free the sport of the squared ring. Keen also teamed with Michigan Track Coach, Don Canham, in 1952 to produce the first film techniques for coaches in wrestling; the films were marketed by Canham's School-Tech, Inc. in 1954. In 1958 Keen founded the company, Cliff Keen Wrestling Products now known as Cliff Keen Athletic, Inc., which is still in the business of manufacturing wrestling gear, equipment and uniforms. Keen was also one of the authors of Championship Wrestling, printed in 1943 while he was serving in the U.S. Navy, 1942–1945; it was a leading book on wrestling technique for several decades. Keen's influence and effect on the sport of amateur wrestling in the United States from the 1930s until present has been incredible and enduring.

== Honors and accolades ==
In 1958, Keen was named to the Helms Hall of Fame. In 1976, Keen was one of five charter members of the National Wrestling Hall of Fame. In 1980, he was inducted into the University of Michigan Athletic Hall of Honor as part of the third induction class. Only three University of Michigan coaches (Fielding H. Yost, Fritz Crisler and Ray Fisher) were inducted into the Hall of Honor before Keen. In 1990, Varsity Arena, home of Michigan's wrestling, men's gymnastics, and women's volleyball teams, was renamed Cliff Keen Arena in his honor. In 2011, he was named to the Sporting Goods Industry Hall of Fame posthumously.

== Death and family ==
Keen died at age 90 at his home in Ann Arbor.

He and his wife Mildred had a son, James Keen and two daughters, Joyce Novak and Shirley (Keen) Leahy. His brother Paul V. Keen coached the University of Oklahoma wrestling team to a national championship. Paul Keen followed his brother into the National Wrestling Hall of Fame in 1977. His older brother, Paul, was also named 1940 U.S. Olympic Wrestling Coach and served two terms as Mayor of Norman, OK. His oldest brother, Bill, was a district court judge in Oklahoma for over 30 years.
