= GameChanger =

Sports team management app

- Type: Subsidiary
- Industry: Sports, software
- Founded: 2010
- Headquarters: New York, New York
- Key people: Sameer Ahuja (president)
- Products: Mobile application, website
- Owner: Dick's Sporting Goods
- Website: gc.com

GameChanger is a US-based technology company whose mobile app and website provide scorekeeping, stats, video streaming, and recap stories to teams and connected fans at the local level. The platform supports features for sports including baseball, softball, and basketball.

Over 24 million games have been scored on GameChanger corresponding to over 500,000 active scoring teams across multiple sports in all age groups.

GameChanger is free for coaches, scorekeepers and team admins. GameChanger uses the Freemium model to generate most of its revenue. Some content, such as live game scores and game stat overviews, is free and accessible to all with a GameChanger account. Premium Fan Content, such as a live GameStream of plays, box scores, season stats, recap stories, and in-game alerts, requires a monthly or yearly Fan Subscription.

== Concept ==
By providing free software to coaches in exchange for their information, GameChanger can collect and manage a massive pool of information that is valuable to parents and fans, making an impact in a market (amateur sports) that is inherently decentralized. Any coach, scorekeeper or team representative can create their team, roster and schedule on the GameChanger website or the GameChanger mobile app. During the game, a Team Admin records the action on the free GameChanger app—tapping simple menus to score every play. A live GameStream of plays and stats is instantly delivered to fans following from the GameChanger website or their mobile devices. After the game, 150 stats, spray charts and game recap stories become available online.

== History ==
GameChanger was launched in 2010 by co-founders Ted Sullivan and Kiril Savino. In fall of 2010, GameChanger and Little League teamed up to launch the Little League Scorekeeper. Powered by GameChanger software, it is the only Authorized Little League scorekeeping application. MaxPreps, the Cal Ripken World Series, Perfect Game, and USA Baseball all became partners in 2011. On May 31, 2012, the 1 millionth game was scored on GameChanger. Given that fewer than 1 million games have been played in the history of the "Big Four" professional sports combined, GameChanger has a claim to having collected the largest collection of sports data in the world. In late 2016, GameChanger was acquired by DICK’S Sporting Goods. In April 2018, GameChanger announced a partnership with the National Federation of State High School Associations.

In June 2018, the company branched out to the clinic business following a new partnership with USA Baseball. GameChanger is currently led by Sameer Ahuja and is wholly owned by DICK'S Sporting Goods.

=== Major League Baseball partnership ===
In June 2023, GameChanger announced a deal with Major League Baseball. The partnership will include GameChanger data appearing on MLB Network and MLB.com.

== Stats ==
GameChanger automatically calculates over 150 stats for baseball and softball teams. GameChanger is the first company to attempt to quantify the Quality At-Bat when it created its QAB stat. The QAB stat is a developmental stat that attempts to minimize the effect of luck while valuing the batting process over the results of the at-bat.

== Analytics and artificial intelligence ==
GameChanger collects data for both teams and then presents the data to the coaches like a hitter's most likely place to hit the ball, or the likelihood that a batter will hit a curveball better than a fastball. GameChanger also uses artificial intelligence technology to produce an automated journalism report after each game and give a live play by play to fans or parents that cannot attend a game but would like to follow along.
