= Esme & Roy =

Animated children's television series

- Genre: Preschool; Musical; Comedy; Fantasy
- Created by: Dustin Ferrer; Amy Steinberg
- Written by: List: Dustin Ferrer Leah Gotcsik Becky Friedman Jennifer Hamburg Clark Stubbs Jim Nolan Sam Dransfield Ron Holsey Dana Starfield Liz Hara Dan Danko Evan Sinclair Corey Powell Margaret Hoffman Lucas Mills Brian Hohlfeld Caitlin Hodson Rick Suvalle Laura Kleinbaum Kristofer Wellman Guy Toubes Lisa Kettle Keion Jackson Leah Kanabroski Michael Matosic Mike Nawrocki
- Directed by: Mike Fallows
- Voices of: Patrick McKenna; Millie Davis
- Theme music composer: Jonathan Evans
- Opening theme: "Esme & Roy Theme Song" by Kellylee Evans
- Ending theme: "Esme & Roy Theme Song" (instrumental)
- Composers: Matt Ouimet; Carl Lenox; Andy McNeill; Daniel Ingram; D.D. Jackson; Jonathan Evans
- Countries of origin: United States; Canada
- Original language: English
- No. of seasons: 2
- No. of episodes: 52 (103 segments) (list of episodes)

Production
- Executive producers: Scott Dyer; Kay Wilson Stallings; Doug Murphy
- Producers: Melissa Graham; Machi Tantillo
- Running time: 23 minutes
- Production companies: Sesame Workshop; Nelvana; Corus Entertainment

Original release
- Network: HBO Family (United States; season 1); HBO Max (United States; season 2); Treehouse TV (Canada)
- Release: August 18, 2018 – February 4, 2021

Esme & Roy is an animated children's television series created by Dustin Ferrer and Amy Steinberg. The series is produced by Sesame Street producer Sesame Workshop and Canada-based animation studio Nelvana, in association with Corus Entertainment.

The series focuses on a young girl named Esme and her best friend, a monster named Roy, who care for all kinds of creatures when their regular guardians need aid. Esme and Roy was broadcast simultaneously on HBO in the United States and Treehouse TV in Canada on August 18, 2018. It was the first original show for HBO Family since Classical Baby, but ironically, it also ended up being the final original show for HBO Family at all.

On May 6, 2019, it was announced that the series was renewed for a second season. The show began airing on PBS Kids on August 30, 2019. In September 2019, it was announced new episodes of the show would be moving from HBO to HBO Max (now Max), starting with the second season. The second season premiered on June 25, 2020. A holiday-themed episode was released on December 10, 2020. The second season premiered on PBS Kids on Saturday, March 6, 2021.

The show was removed from HBO Max on August 17, 2022.

== Plot ==
Esme & Roy follows a young girl named Esme and her best monster friend, Roy, the most in-demand "monstersitters" (like babysitters, but they look after monsters) in Monsterdale, a town populated mostly by colorful monsters. The duo set out to solve big problems by playing and helping out the young monsters with their problems.

== Episodes ==
Season	Segments	Episodes	Originally released		
Season	Segments	Episodes	First released	Last released	Network
1	52	26	August 18, 2018	April 27, 2019	HBO (United States); Treehouse TV (Canada)
2	51	26	June 25, 2020	February 4, 2021	HBO Max (United States); Treehouse TV (Canada)

== Characters ==
=== Main ===
- Esmeralda "Esme" (voiced by Millie Davis) is a 9-year-old African-American girl and a monster sitter, and she has a skill for inventing activities to fix the monsters' problems, with the help of the MonsterCase, a suitcase full of fun and games that encourages the monsters to play their problems away and turns into a motorized scooter when taking Esme and Roy to where their monstersitting service is needed. Esme only went through a Monster Sitter Meltdown in "Party Time", but like what she does for the little monsters she and Roy watch, Roy helps her feel better by singing the "Belly Breathing" song, which is normally sung by Esme. In "Stroller Derby", it's revealed that Esme goes to a school that's different from the one the little monsters go to.
- Roy (voiced by Patrick McKenna) is Esme's best friend and a yellow monster. He is a lovable, silly monster who knows everything about monsters with his Monster Fact book. He loves to eat meatballs. Roy went through a Monster Sitter Meltdown in 3 episodes which they are: "Two Can Play That Game", "Sing Out, Roy", & "Training Day", but Esme, along with the little monsters, helped him feel better by singing the "Belly Breathing" song, which is normally sung by Esme doing it solo. But, Esme did help him feel better by singing the "Belly Breathing" song solo in two episodes only.
- Dumpling is Esme and Roy's pet guinea pig/hamster-like monster. She can roll herself up into a ball and loves to dance.
- Hugo Ooga (voiced by Shayle Simons) is a theatrical 4-year-old winged monster. He loves to be the star of the show and creates his own spotlight by clapping his hands.
- Fig Ooga (voiced by Elle Simons) is Hugo's 1-year-old baby sister. Unlike her brother, she has no wings; as a result, she can't fly like him. While small, she has super strength and loves to pick up Roy to demonstrate it. She shrinks if she smells a Sludgeflower.
- Tillie Plink (voiced by Abigail Oliver) is an active 3-year-old monster with pink fur, blue eyes, and red hair tied into pigtails with a pair of blue hairbows. She has a need for speed and loves cars and playing rough-and-tumble games and she spins a lot really fast like a tornado when she's sad, for fun, or for dancing. Sometimes, she refers to herself in third-person, much like Elmo from Sesame Street.
- Snugs Muzzywump (voiced by Benjamin Hum) is an adorable 3-year-old monster who loves to hug, cuddle and snuggle with people and monsters alike. He puffs up when he gets scared or upset, but is easily able to be relaxed. He has a baby brother named Fuzzy.
- Simon Swoozle (voiced by Jacob Soley) is an 8-year-old six-tentacled green monster with yellow hair, brown eyes and blue glasses. He loves enforcing routine and order. He has a big heart, is very artistic, so cute, and he is very smart.
- Sid Hoozlewoo (voiced by Christian Corrao) & Lucy Hoozlewoo (voiced by Hattie Kragten) appear in "Imitation Frustration", "Special Delivery", "Don't Bug Me", & "Warm and Fuzzy Day" (though Sid has appeared without Lucy in "A Mighty Shy Guy" alongside Frank Bleederblop). They can change colors, copy what they do and bounce around on their springy tails.
- Frank Bleedeerblop (voiced by Justin Paul Kelly) & Franny Bleedeerblop (voiced by Lilly Bartlam) appear in "Two Can Play That Game" & "Special Delivery" (though Frank has appeared without Franny in "Personal Space" alongside Fig & Hugo & in "A Mighty Shy Guy" along with Sid Hoozlewoo). They are twin dragon-like monsters.
- Mom and Dad: Esme's parents are, so far, only glimpsed during the opening theme of the show. They live in the house next to the garage where Esme and Roy usually hang out when they're not on their monstersitting duties and are shown waving goodbye to Esme and Roy as they set off to where they're needed. Aside from Esme, they appear to be the only human residents of Monsterdale.

=== Recurring ===
- Mr. Plink (voiced by Zachary Bennett) is Tillie's dad.
- Grammy Swoozle (voiced by Jayne Eastwood) is Simon's grandma.
- Fuzzy Muzzywump (voiced by Bryn McAuley) is Snugs' baby brother & Mrs.Muzzywump's youngest son.
- Willie (vocal effects by Richard Binsley) is Simon and Grammy's pet dog.
- Mrs. Muzzywump (voiced by Denise Oliver) is Snugs & Fuzzy's mom.
- Mr. Bleederblop (voiced by Jamie Watson) is Frank & Franny's dad.
- Mr. Ooga (voiced by Martin Roach) is Hugo & Fig's dad.
- Mrs. Ooga (voiced by Melissa Altro) is Hugo & Fig's mom.
- Mrs. Hoozlewoo (voiced by Kylee Evans) is Sid & Lucy's mom.
- Lottie (voiced by Lilly Bartlam) is introduced in "Monster's Little Helper". She wants to learn to be a Monster Sitter from Esme and Roy. She has yellow fur & flies with wings. She returns & makes a minor part in "Game Plan" to help monsters prepare for Camp Monsterdale.
- Norm (voiced by Patrick McKenna) appears in "Supermarket Match". He is a blue monster with tentacles, blue hair, & green eyes. He typically speaks like a teenager. He appears to be a monster of all trades, as he has a different job in every episode.

== Production ==
The show was announced on October 17, 2016 with the show being picked up by HBO in the US as part of its wider deal with Sesame Workshop. Nelvana ordered 52 11-minute segments, equal to 26 half-hours, of each season of Esme & Roy, for 104 11-minute segments (two of which comprise a 22-minute special episode) in total.

== Broadcast ==
Esme & Roy premiered on Treehouse TV in Canada and HBO in the United States on August 18, 2018. The show began international broadcast following its U.S. and Canadian premieres on Tiny Pop in the United Kingdom.

The show made its public television debut during the Family Night block on the PBS Kids 24/7 channel on August 30, 2019, and was added to the regular schedule on August 31, 2019. The last airing on PBS Kids was June 27, 2021.

The show began airing on the Cartoonito preschool block on Cartoon Network and HBO Max on September 18, 2021, in the United States. Esme & Roy was premiered on Disney Junior Asia from August 12, 2019, until April 2021 before being moved to Cartoon Network Asia in 2022 as part of the Cartoonito block.

== Reception ==
=== Critical ===
Esme & Roy has been met with mostly positive reception. Emily Ashby of Common Sense Media rated Esme & Roy a total of 5 out of 5 stars, stating that Esme & Roy's "thoughtful approach to self-awareness and mindful behavior makes it an excellent tool for families and caretakers to use in teaching similar skills to kids," and that the broader emotions will relate to a child's experiences.

=== Awards and nominations ===
Year	Award	Category	Nominee	Result	Refs
2019	Kidscreen Awards	Best New Series	Esme & Roy	Won	
2019	Canadian Screen Awards	Best Original Song – Animation	"Ballet Pirates", from the episode "Two Can Play At That Game"	Nominated	
2019	NAMIC Vision Awards	Children's series	Esme & Roy	Nominated	
2019	Daytime Emmy Awards	Outstanding Preschool Children's Animated Series	Esme & Roy	Nominated	
2019	Daytime Emmy Awards	Outstanding Interactive Media for a Daytime Program	Esme & Roy	Nominated	
2019	Daytime Emmy Awards	Outstanding Casting for an Animated Series or Special	Esme & Roy	Nominated	
2019	YMA Awards of Excellence	Best Program, Animation – Preschool	"Hugo, We Have a Problem" / "A New Chapter"	Nominated	
2021	Daytime Emmy Awards	Outstanding Preschool Children's Animated Series	Esme & Roy	Nominated	
