= Dick's Sporting Goods =

American sporting goods retailing corporation

Dick's Sporting Goods, Inc.

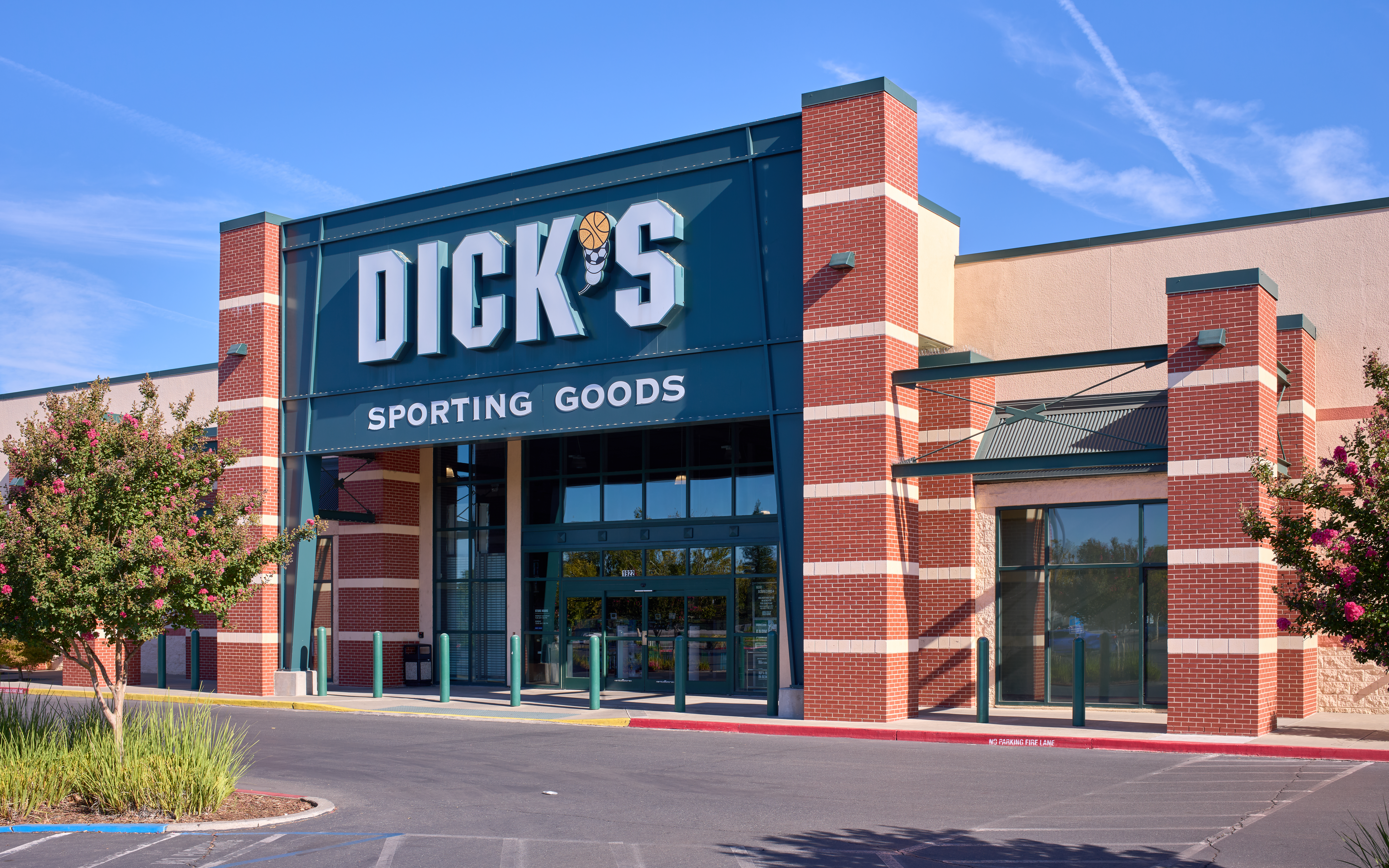
- Exterior of a typical Dick's Sporting Goods store in Chico, California (2026)
- Type: Public
- Traded as: NYSE: DKS; S&P 400 component
- Industry: Retail
- Founded: 1948; 78 years ago in Binghamton, New York, U.S.
- Founder: Richard "Dick" Stack
- Headquarters: Findlay Township, Pennsylvania, U.S.
- Number of locations: 888 (2026)
- Key people: Lauren Hobart (president and CEO); Edward W. Stack (executive chairman); Navdeep Gupta (CFO); Vlad Rak (CTO)
- Brands: Going Going Gone!; Filed House; House of Sport; Public Lands
- Revenue: ▲US$14.1 billion (2025)
- Operating income: ▲US$1.52 billion (2025)
- Net income: ▲US$1.28 billion (2025)
- Total assets: ▲US$17.411 billion (2025)
- Total equity: ▲US$5.540 billion (2025)
- Number of employees: 105,200 (2025)
- Subsidiaries: Foot Locker; Golf Galaxy; GameChanger
- Website: dickssportinggoods.com

Dick's Sporting Goods, Inc. (stylized as DICK'S Sporting Goods) is an American chain of sporting goods stores headquartered in Findlay Township, Pennsylvania, a suburb of Pittsburgh. Founded in 1948 by Richard "Dick" Stack, it is the largest sporting goods retailer in the United States and is listed on the Fortune 500.

== Overview ==
Dick's is the largest sporting goods retail company in the United States, with over 3,195 stores as of 2026. The public company is based in Findlay Township, Pennsylvania, outside Pittsburgh, and has approximately 105,200 employees as of January 2026. The company includes concept stores such as Field House, Going Going Gone!, Public Lands, and House of Sport. The company has acquired Golf Galaxy, GameChanger, and Foot Locker, among others.

Edward W. Stack is the executive chairman. Lauren Hobart is president and chief executive officer of the company, and Navdeep Gupta is chief financial officer since 2021. Hobart succeeded Edward W. Stack as CEO on February 1, 2021, becoming the company's first female CEO.

== History ==
Richard "Dick" Stack started the company as a fishing tackle store in Binghamton, New York, in 1948. He began with a $300 loan from his grandmother.

Edward W. Stack and his siblings purchased Dick's from their father in the early 1980s, when the company had two locations in Upstate New York. Stack established a board of directors, opened additional stores, and relocated the company's headquarters to Pittsburgh in 1994. He became chairman and chief executive officer following his father's retirement in 1984, and led the company during its initial public offering in 2002.

Dick's operated primarily throughout the Eastern United States until 2009 and has since expanded across the country. There are about 888 Dick's stores in 47 states, as of 2026. In 2012, the company opened three True Runner stores targeting runners in Boston, the St. Louis suburb Brentwood, and Pittsburgh's Shadyside neighborhood. The stores closed in early 2017.

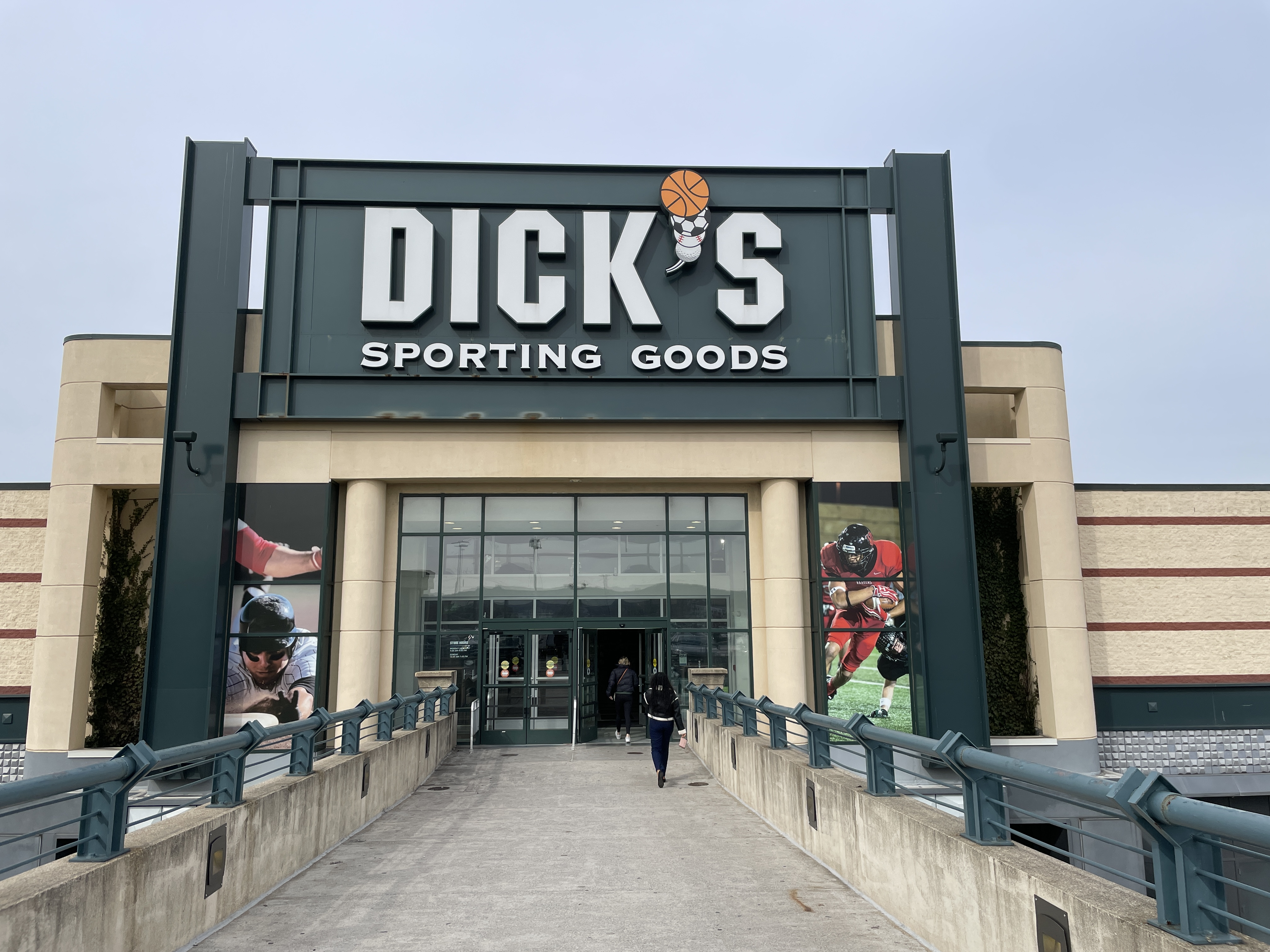
Dick's Sporting Goods store at the King of Prussia Mall in King of Prussia, Pennsylvania

Dick's launched the women's athleisure, fitness, and lifestyle store Chelsea Collective in 2015, opening two stores in Pittsburgh and Tysons, Virginia, in the Washington, D.C. metro area. The shops closed in 2017. The company launched Dick's Team Sports HQ in early 2016, which offered youth sports teams websites, uniforms, and sponsorship options. Later in 2019, the management sold the two underlying technology platforms (Blue Sombrero and Affinity Sports) to Stack Sports, effectively ending its operation of Team Sports HQ.

Dick's opened its first Field & Stream store in Cranberry Township, a suburb of Pittsburgh, in 2013. Thirty-five Field & Stream stores were open across the country as of 2018. In 2023, Dick's shuttered its Field & Stream brand by converting its remaining such stores to its House of Sport concept or large-format Dick's stores.

After the Stoneman Douglas High School shooting in February 2018, Dick's stopped selling assault weapons and high-capacity magazines, and increased the minimum age for purchasing guns to 21. Dick's-branded stores had suspended assault-style weapon sales following the Sandy Hook Elementary School shooting in 2012, but the guns were still available for purchase at Field & Stream locations, which have since been shuttered. Dick's has never carried bump stocks. By 2020, the hunting category merchandise was reduced to 12% of Dick's stores.

The company operates six distribution centers. The most recent opened in April 2026 in Fort Worth, Texas and is reported to rely heavily on automation. In 2019, Dick's launched its private-label clothing line called DSG. The company's other brands include the women's line Calia, and their menswear brand VRST, among others.

Dick's opened its first "House of Sport" concept stores in Victor, New York, and Knoxville, Tennessee, in 2021. The stores are larger than Dick's flagship locations, sell higher-end gear and include features such as an outdoor turf field and track, climbing wall, batting cages, and a digital golf range. The same year, Dick's also launched and opened Public Lands, a chain of stores that focuses on outdoor recreation including camping, hiking, and biking. It was reported that Public Lands donates 1% of sales to the Dick's Sporting Goods Foundation's Public Lands Fund, oriented towards conservation and outdoor activities.

In 2022, Dick's Sporting Goods launched DSG Ventures, an investment fund worth $50 million.

In August 2025, Dick's launched Cookie Jar & A Dream Studios, a proprietary content and production studio with focus on sports. The name of the studio references the founding story of Dick's, where the first store was opened on a $300 cookie jar savings budget. Its first release titled Big Dreams: The Little League World Series 2024 premiered on ESPN on 12 August 2025 and was produced in partnership with Imagine Entertainment and MLB Studios.

=== Acquisitions ===
A mannequin wearing Calia branded golf apparel with some golf clubs next to it. Calia is a name brand of Dick's that sells activewear and apparel for women.

Dick's acquired Galyan's in July 2004. The company agreed to purchase Golf Galaxy for $225 million in November 2006. Dick's confirmed plans to close Golf Galaxy's headquarters in Eden Prairie, Minnesota, in mid-2008.

Dick's acquired Chick's Sporting Goods in November 2007 for $71 million. At the time, Chick's operated 15 specialty sporting goods stores in Southern California. Dick's purchased the San Diego-based sports management technology company Affinity Sports for an undisclosed amount in mid-2016. In September, Dick's acquired Sports Authority's brand name and intellectual property. There were 450 Sports Authority locations at the time.

Dick's acquired Golfsmith, the largest golf retailer in the United States, at a bankruptcy auction in October 2016. Dick's bid approximately $70 million for all of Golfsmith's intellectual property and inventory. The company planned to retain around 30 of more than 100 Golfsmith's locations and 500 employees. As a result, in 2017 Dick's rebranded 36 Golfsmith stores in 16 U.S. states as Golf Galaxy. That increased the number of Golf Galaxy stores to 98, located in 33 states. In 2016, Dick's Sporting Goods also acquired GameChanger, a developer of a youth sports app which offers scorekeeping, live streaming app, statistics and team management.

In February 2023, Dick's Sporting Goods purchased Moosejaw from Walmart for an undisclosed amount.

In May 2025, Dick's Sporting Goods announced to acquire Foot Locker, Inc. and all its subsidiary brands. The deal covered 2,400 retail stores in 20 countries across North America, Europe, Asia and Australia, and the transaction value was estimated at US$2.4 billion. According to official statements, the companies were expected to continue their positioning as independent brands. The acquisition was finalized in September 2025.

=== Lawsuits and legal proceedings ===
- In February 2014, Dick's brought a lawsuit against Modell's Sporting Goods CEO Mitchell Modell (who featured on an episode of Undercover Boss in 2012), for going undercover into one of their stores to gain access to retail secrets. The lawsuit was settled out of court by April for undisclosed terms. Independent analysts suggested that Modell visited the store on a whim rather than as part of some plot to steal information.
- In 2018, Dick's was sued for age discrimination by at least two people for no longer selling long guns to 18-20 year olds where legal. One case was settled in November 2018; details of the settlement are confidential, but it did not directly result in any changes to the retailer's policies. The second case was reported as "resolved" by an attorney for the plaintiff in late 2018 without disclosing details of any settlement.

== Partnerships and sponsorships ==
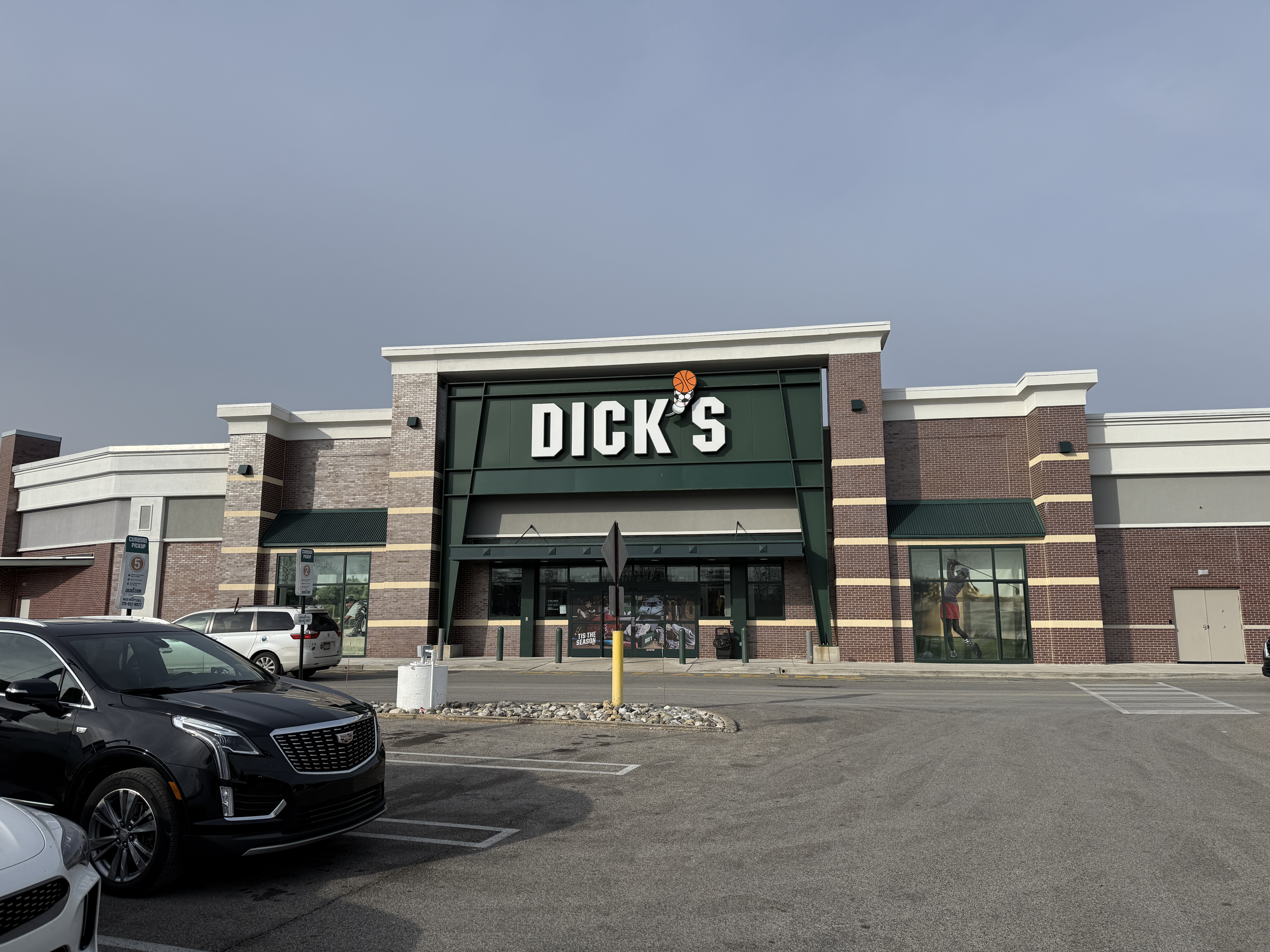
Dick's Sporting Goods store in Willow Grove, Pennsylvania

The company signed a 20-year naming rights agreement for Dick's Sporting Goods Park, a soccer-specific stadium for the Colorado Rapids team in Commerce City, Colorado, in 2006. Dick's has sponsored the Pittsburgh Penguins and the team's home arena, PPG Paints Arena (formerly Consol Energy Center). Sporting events sponsored by Dick's have included the Dick's Sporting Goods Open and the Pittsburgh Marathon. Dick's began sponsoring ESPN's college football kickoff week in 2009.

In 2015, the company sponsored Olympic and Paralympic athletes and hopefuls and became the "official sporting goods retailer" for Team USA for the 2016 Summer Olympics and Paralympics. Dick's and Team USA established the Ambassador Program and Contender's Program in partnership with the United States Olympic Committee, employing Olympians and prospective Olympic athletes. Dick's employed approximately 200 Team USA athletes competing in 35 different Olympic and Paralympic sports as of March–July 2016. The athletes worked in 89 stores in 32 states.

Dick's partnered with Carrie Underwood in 2015 to launch Calia, a fitness lifestyle line. In 2017, Dick's entered a multiyear partnership with the United States Youth Soccer Association to provide team management technology and sponsor the US Youth Soccer National Championships.

Since September 2021, Dick's has been in a multiyear agreement to be the official retail partner of the WNBA.

In 2021, Dick's collaborated with Nike and DeVonta Smith. In 2023, the company worked with the Boston Athletic Association, making Dick's the official sponsor of all of the association's events, including the 2023 Boston Marathon and associated events. They also became the official sporting-goods retailer of the NCAA. That same year, Dick's subsidiary GameChanger signed a deal with Major League Baseball to promote youth sports.

In 2024, Dick's became an official partner of the LA28 and Team USA for the 2028 Summer Olympic Games in Los Angeles, with supporting status for 2024 Paris Olympics and the 2026 Italy Winter Olympics. The company will act as an official sporting goods retailer, with plans to co-create LA28-branded gear for sale.

== Dick's Sporting Goods Foundation ==
In 2014, the Dick's Sporting Goods Foundation committed up to $2 million annually to fund youth sports via its Sports Matter program. The Sports Matter program was initiated in 2014 to provide grants, equipment, and sponsorships to underserved youth sports programs. Since its inception, Sports Matter has pledged more than US$100 million.

In 2023, Dick's Sporting Goods launched the 'Sports Change Lives' campaign to encourage participation in sports. The campaign partnered with Nike to feature athletes such as Mike Trout, A'ja Wilson, and Carmelo Anthony. Participating athletes each nominate a youth sports organization to receive a $75,000 grant. As of 2023, Dick's Sporting Goods and its foundation has pledged US$170 million for youth sports initiatives.

== See also ==
- Academy Sports + Outdoors
- Bass Pro Shops
- Cabela's
- Legendary Whitetails
- Scheels
- Sportsman's Warehouse
- List of Pennsylvania companies
