= Lauren Hobart =

American businesswoman (born 1968)

Lauren R. Hobart
- Born: August 1, 1968 (age 58); New York City, US
- Education: University of Pennsylvania; Stanford University
- Title: President and CEO, Dick's Sporting Goods
- Term: February 2021-
- Predecessor: Edward W. Stack
- Board member of: Dick's Sporting Goods; Marriott International
- Children: 3

Lauren Hobart (born August 1, 1968) is an American businesswoman who has served as president and CEO of Dick's Sporting Goods since February 2021.

== Education ==
Hobart earned a bachelor's degree from the University of Pennsylvania and an MBA from Stanford University.

== Career ==
Hobart worked for Wells Fargo and JPMorgan Chase, followed by 14 years at PepsiCo in a number of leadership roles, including CMO of Carbonated Soft Drinks in North America. She joined Dick's Sporting Goods in 2011 as senior vice president and chief marketing officer. In 2015, she became executive vice president and CMO, and went on to become chief customer and digital officer. In 2017, Hobart was appointed president and in 2018, she joined the board of directors.

Hobart was on the board of Sonic Corporation from 2014 to 2018. In October 2020, Yum! Brands announced the appointment of Hobart as a non-executive director, effective November 2020. She was on the board of Yum! Brands from 2020 to 2022 and a year later in March 2023 she joined the board of Marriott International.

In February 2021, Hobart succeeded Edward W. Stack as CEO of Dick's Sporting Goods. She was the first woman to hold this position for the company, which was previously held by members of the Stack family.

== Philanthropic efforts ==
Hobart is president of The Dick's Sporting Goods Foundation. She initiated the Sports Matter program in 2014, which provides grants, equipment and sponsorships to underserved youth sports programs. Hobart is also a member of The Business Council.
