= Chuck Taylor (salesman) =

American basketball player and sport shoe salesman (1901–1969)

- Born: Charles Hollis Taylor; June 24, 1901; Brown County, Indiana, U.S.
- Died: June 23, 1969 (aged 67); Port Charlotte, Florida, U.S.
- Occupations: Salesman, basketball player
- Known for: Chuck Taylor All-Stars

Charles Hollis Taylor (June 24, 1901 – June 23, 1969) was an American basketball player and basketball shoe salesman-marketer who was associated with Chuck Taylor All-Stars, which he helped to improve and promote.

== Early life and education ==
Charles H. "Chuck" Taylor was born in rural Brown County, Indiana, on June 24, 1901. Taylor, a graduate of Columbus High School in Columbus, Indiana, in 1919, played guard position on the school's basketball team. He became captain of the varsity team while a high school sophomore, and was also a two-time all-state team selection.

== Career ==
Taylor began his career as a semi-professional basketball player in 1919 and as the player-manager for the Converse All-Stars basketball team in the mid-1920s, but he became widely known as a salesman and promoter of Converse All Star basketball shoes. Taylor traveled the country providing local basketball clinics, making special appearances, and meeting with customers in local sporting goods stores to promote the company's basketball shoes. During World War II he coached the Wright Field Air-Tecs basketball team during the 1944–45 season and served as a physical fitness instructor for the U.S. military before resuming his career as a traveling salesman for Converse. Taylor retired from work in 1968.

=== Early years ===
In 1917, while Taylor was still in high school, Converse began manufacturing one of the first basketball shoes. At least one source indicates that in 1918 Taylor wore Converse Non-Skids, the canvas and rubber shoe that was the forerunner to the Converse All Stars.

Taylor made his debut as a semi-professional basketball player on March 19, 1919, playing for the Columbus Commercials when he was seventeen years old. (Taylor played as a substitute for another of the team's players during the final three minutes of the game, but he scored no points.) After the Columbus Commercials disbanded the following season, Taylor continued to pursue a career in professional basketball, which included playing for the Akron Firestone Non-Skids, a semi-professional team, as well as other semi-professional teams in Detroit, Michigan, and Chicago, Illinois. Although Taylor played on professional and semi-professional teams for eleven seasons, no records have been located that confirm Taylor's link to playing for the Buffalo Germans and Original Celtics as some have claimed. Taylor did not clarify the assertions.

With one notable exception, Taylor's career as a player on a semi-professional team ended in the 1920s in Chicago when he became a traveling salesman and product promoter for the Converse Rubber Shoe Company. However, during the 1926–27 season, Taylor was a player-manager of the All-Stars, the Chicago-based touring team sponsored by Converse to promote their shoes.

=== Converse salesman ===
In 1921 S. R. "Bob" Pletz, an avid sportsman, hired Taylor as a salesman for the Converse Rubber Shoe Company when Taylor visited the company's offices in Chicago. The previous year the company had introduced an earlier version of Converse All Stars as one of the first shoes specifically designed to be worn when playing basketball. Within a year of Taylor's arrival the company had adopted his suggestions of changing the design of the Converse All Star shoe to provide enhanced flexibility and support. The restyled shoe also included a distinctive star-shape logo on the patch that protected the ankle. After Taylor's signature was added to the All Star logo on the patch of the shoes, they became known as Chuck Taylor All Stars.

Most American basketball players wore Chuck Taylor All Stars between the mid-1920s and the 1970s. When basketball became an Olympic sport in 1936, he designed a white high-top model with blue and red trim for the 1936 Olympic Games. The Converse All Star shoe remained the official shoe of the United States Olympics team from 1936 to 1968.

As a marketing representative for Converse, Taylor made his living as a salesman who traveled across the country to conduct basketball clinics and sell shoes. For many years he lived year-round in motels, driving around the United States with a trunk full of shoe samples. Abraham Aamidor, a Taylor biographer, also points out that Taylor was not sparing in his use of the Converse expense account. Converse listed Taylor's address as the offices of its regional headquarters in downtown Chicago, and later its offices in Melrose Park, Illinois, instead of a permanent residence. Joe Dean, one of Taylor's former co-workers, also recalled that Taylor kept a locker in the company's Chicago warehouse to store and exchange seasonal clothing items. Converse paid Taylor a salary, but he received no commission for any of the 600 million pairs of Chuck Taylor shoes that have been sold.

Joe Dean, who worked as a sales executive for Converse for nearly 30 years before becoming the athletic director at Louisiana State University, told Bob Ford of The Philadelphia Inquirer, "It was impossible not to like him, and he knew everybody. If you were a coach and you wanted to find a job, you called Chuck Taylor. Athletic directors talked to him all the time when they were looking for a coach."

=== Basketball promoter ===
The basketball clinic was Taylor's main method of promoting basketball. He led his first informal clinic in 1922 at North Carolina State University, and continued the effort for years, making it an established aspect of his sales promotions. Taylor's next "demonstration," as he described it, was for Fielding Yost at the University of Michigan, followed by Columbia and then for Doc Carlson at Pitt. Taylor's free basketball clinics continued for nearly thirty years in high school and college gyms and YMCAs around the United States. As Steve Stone, a former Converse president, once noted: "Chuck's gimmick was to go to a small town, romance the coach, and put on a clinic. He would teach basketball and work with the local sporting goods dealer, but without encroaching on the coach's own system." In addition to the clinics, Taylor toured with the Converse All-Star basketball team, traveled the country to meet with customers in sporting goods shops, and made numerous publicity appearances, including playing with local teams.

Another of Taylor's promotional tools was the annual Converse Basketball Yearbook, which he developed in 1922 and was enlarged in 1929. The yearbook commemorated the best players, trainers, teams and the greatest moments of the sport, as well as providing good publicity for Taylor's clinics and the Converse company's All Star basketball shoes. Taylor also made his own All-American selections.

In 1935, Taylor invented a "stitchless" basketball that was easier to control.

=== World War II military service ===
During World War II, Taylor was commissioned in the U.S. Navy and later transferred to the U.S. Army, but he was too old to serve in combat. Taylor's main contribution during the war years was coaching the Wright Field Air-Tecs basketball team at the United States Army Air Forces base in Dayton, Ohio, during the 1944–45 season. Before leaving the military in 1945, Taylor had recruited pilots and became a fitness consultant for the U.S. military, in addition to conducting physical fitness programs for new recruits. GIs were soon doing calisthenics while wearing Chuck Taylor All Stars, which had become the "official" basketball shoe of the U.S. armed forces.

=== Postwar career ===
In 1950 Taylor moved to Los Angeles, California. He also continued to travel to military bases and in 1957 made a trip to South America on behalf of the U.S. State Department.

Taylor spent the early 1960s in semi-retirement, and officially retired from Converse in 1968.

== Personal life ==
Taylor's first wife was Ruth Adler, a former Hollywood actress who appeared in films such as Bringing Up Baby (1938) and Design for Scandal (1941). They married on May 26, 1950, in Carson City, Nevada, and settled in Los Angeles, California. The couple separated in 1955 and divorced in 1957.

Taylor married Lucille Kimbrell on December 11, 1962, in Reno, Nevada. She was the former wife of Eugene Kimbrell, a co-founder of the National Association of Intercollegiate Athletics. Chuck and Lucille Taylor resided in Port Charlotte, Florida, where Taylor spent the final years of his life. He died of a heart attack on June 23, 1969, one day short of his sixty-eighth birthday. He is buried at Restlawn Memorial Gardens in Port Charlotte.

== Legacy ==
Taylor was elected into the Sporting Goods Industry Hall of Fame in 1958, the Naismith Memorial Basketball Hall of Fame in 1969, and the Indiana Basketball Hall of Fame in 1989.

By the 1960s, Converse had captured about 70 to 80 percent of the basketball shoe market before the company's sales declined. Beginning in the 1980s, Converse All Stars enjoyed a comeback in popularity as casual footwear. Nike acquired Converse in 2003 and continues to market Chuck Taylor All Star shoes in mass merchandise outlets worldwide.
