= List of Esme & Roy episodes =

The following is a list of episodes from the series Esme & Roy. In February 2020, a second season was announced. In December 2020, a holiday episode was released.

== Series overview ==
| Season | Segments | Episodes | Originally released | | |
| Season | Segments | Episodes | First released | Last released | Network |
|---|---|---|---|---|---|
| 1 | 52 | 26 | August 18, 2018 | April 27, 2019 | HBO (United States); Treehouse TV (Canada) |
| 2 | 51 | 26 | June 25, 2020 | February 4, 2021 | HBO Max (United States); Treehouse TV (Canada) |

== Episodes ==
=== Season 1 (2018–19) ===
| No. overall | No. in season | Title | Written by | Original release date | Prod. code | US viewers (millions) |
|---|---|---|---|---|---|---|
| 1a | 1a | "Monster Trucks!" | Dustin Ferrer | August 18, 2018 | 101 | 0.01 |
Esme and Roy watch a car-loving monster, Tillie, but when bath time comes, she refuses to be tidy. Songs: "Glitter Jar" sung by Esme, "Car Wash Bath" sung by Esme, Roy, Tillie.
| 1b | 1b | "Lunch Crunch" | Leah Gotcsik | August 18, 2018 | 101 | 0.01 |
Esme and Roy teach Simon about trying new foods. Songs: "This is Lunch Just for You" sung by Esme, Roy, Simon, "Belly Breathing" sung by Esme.
| 2a | 2a | "Dark and Stormy Knight" | Becky Friedman | August 25, 2018 | 102 | 0.04 |
Esme and Roy watch Snugs, who is scared of thunder Songs: "Look Over Here" sung by Esme, Roy, "Self Talk" sung by Esme.
| 2b | 2b | "Two Can Play That Game" | Dustin Ferrer | August 25, 2018 | 102 | 0.04 |
Frank and Franny want to play something different. Songs: "Belly Breathing" sung by Esme, "Ballet Pirates" sung by Esme, Roy, Frank, Franny.
| 3a | 3a | "Noisy Naptime" | Jennifer Hamburg | September 1, 2018 | 103 | 0.04 |
The Monster Sitters try to prevent Hugo from making noise so his baby sister, Fig wouldn't wake up from a nap. Songs: "The Monstersitters Lullaby" sung by Esme, Roy, Hugo, "Self Talk" sung by Esme.
| 3b | 3b | "The Hugo Express" | Clark Stubbs | September 1, 2018 | 103 | 0.04 |
Hugo doesn't want the game he is playing to end when it's time for him to clean up his toys. Songs: "Glitter Jar" sung by Esme, "Hugo Express Lament" sung by Hugo, "The Hugo Express" sung by Esme, Roy, Hugo.
| 4a | 4a | "Gentle, Gentle" | Becky Friedman | September 8, 2018 | 104 | 0.03 |
Esme and Roy bring Dumpling to baby Fig's house, but she plays too roughly with Dumpling. Songs: "Belly Breathing" sung by Esme, "Dumpling's Check-Up" sung by Esme, Roy, Fig.
| 4b | 4b | "The Case of the Missing Cuddles" | Jim Nolan | September 8, 2018 | 104 | 0.03 |
Esme and Roy put Snugs to bed after searching for his lost toy. Songs: "Where Could Sir Cuddles Be?" sung by Esme, Roy, Snugs, "Self Talk" sung by Esme.
| 5a | 5a | "Supermarket Match" | Sam Dransfield | September 15, 2018 | 105 | 0.05 |
Esme and Roy take Tillie to the supermarket. Songs: "Grocery Shopping Car" sung by Esme, Roy, Tillie, "Belly Breathing" sung by Esme.
| 5b | 5b | "Imitation Frustration" | Ron Holsey | September 15, 2018 | 105 | 0.05 |
Sid keeps copying Lucy and that causes Lucy to get irritated. Songs: "Let's Find Something Else To Do" sing by Esme, Roy, Sid, Lucy, "Glitter Jar" sung by Esme.
| 6a | 6a | "Hugo, We Have a Problem" | Jim Nolan | September 22, 2018 | 106 | N/A |
Esme and Roy intend to take Hugo and baby Fig to the planetarium on a rainy day, but Fig refuses to wear her raincoat. Songs: "The Monster Shimmy" sung by Esme, Roy, Fig, Hugo, "Belly Breathing" sung by Esme, "Hugo Space Lament" sung by Hugo.
| 6b | 6b | "A New Chapter" | Dana Starfield | September 22, 2018 | 106 | N/A |
Esme and Roy watch Simon, who can't wait to read his new book. Songs: "Just Pick One" sung by Esme, Roy, "Glitter Jar" sung by Esme.
| 7a | 7a | "Game Plan" | Leah Gotcsik | September 29, 2018 | 107 | N/A |
Tillie heads to Camp Monsterdale. Songs: "Camp Monsterdale" sung by Roy, Tillie, "Self Talk" sung by Esme
| 7b | 7b | "A Way to Play" | Liz Hara | September 29, 2018 | 107 | N/A |
Simon and Tillie arrive at Monster Sitters' HQ for a playdate. Songs: "Glitter Jar" sung by Esme, "Better Together" sung by Esme, Roy, Simon, Tillie.
| 8a | 8a | "Sing Out, Roy" | Dan Danko | October 6, 2018 | 108 | N/A |
Esme helps Roy overcome his stage fright. Songs: "Belly Breathing" sung by Esme, Roy, Simon, Snugs, "Best Friends Anywhere" sung by Esme, Roy, Fig, Hugo, Snugs, Simon.
| 8b | 8b | "Monster's Little Helper" | Dustin Ferrer | October 6, 2018 | 108 | N/A |
Esme and Roy meet Lottie, who wants to be a monster sitter. Songs: "I Can Help" sung by Lottie.
| 9a | 9a | "Simon's Sleepover" | Jennifer Hamburg | October 13, 2018 | 109 | N/A |
Simon begins to miss home during a sleepover. Songs: "Glitter Jar" sung by Esme, "Make Your Own Me Tree" sing by Esme, Roy, Simon.
| 9b | 9b | "Take a Hike" | Evan Sinclair | October 13, 2018 | 109 | N/A |
Esme, Roy and Snugs get lost in the woods. Songs: "Follow Me" sung by Esme, Roy, "Self Talk" sung by Esme.
| 10a | 10a | "Birds of a Feather" | Corey Powell | October 20, 2018 | 110 | N/A |
Esme and Roy take three little monsters to the science museum. Songs: "Belly Breathing" sung by Esme, "Flying in the Shape of a V" sung by Esme, Roy, Tillie, Simon, Snugs.
| 10b | 10b | "Cowgirl Fig" | Clark Stubbs | October 20, 2018 | 110 | TBA |
Hugo makes a Western film starring Fig. Songs: "Lights, Camera, Action!" sung by Esme, Roy, Fig, Hugo, "Glitter Jar" sung by Esme.
| 11a | 11a | "When Figs Fly" | Sam Dransfield | October 27, 2018 | 111 | N/A |
Fig wants to fly like Hugo. Songs: "How Do You Like Flyin'" sung by Esme, Roy, Fig, Hugo, "Glitter Jar" sung by Esme.
| 11b | 11b | "Tillie's Tough Break" | Becky Friedman | October 27, 2018 | 111 | N/A |
Esme And Roy try to cheer up Tillie when she hurts her leg and is unable to go to Monster Mountain. Songs: "Cheer Up, Tillie!" sung by Esme, Roy, "Belly Breathing" sung by Esme.
| 12a | 12a | "Cloudy Comet Calamity" | Margaret Hoffman | November 3, 2018 | 112 | N/A |
Simon brings his telescope to see the Great Swoozle Comet, but clouds block his view. Songs: "Can You See It?" sung by Esme, Roy, "Glitter Jar" sung by Esme.
| 12b | 12b | "Training Day" | Dan Danko | November 3, 2018 | 112 | N/A |
Esme and Roy are brushing up on their monster-sitting skills. Songs: "Belly Breathing" sung by Esme, "A Really Great Team" sung by Esme, Roy.
| 13a | 13a | "Monster Mash" | Lucas Mills | November 10, 2018 | 113 | N/A |
Hugo, Tillie and Simon go to the Monster Sitters' HQ for a dance party, and Esme and Roy try to teach Simon a dance pattern to follow. Songs: "Dance Like Me" sung by Esme, Roy, Hugo, Tillie, Simon, "Belly Breathing" sung by Esme.
| 13b | 13b | "Block Party" | Lucas Mills | November 10, 2018 | 113 | N/A |
Esme and Roy are watching Tillie, who needs to clean up her blocks in the backyard before she can play with her new truck. Songs: "Pick 'Em Up (Clean Up Time)" sung by Esme, Roy, Tillie, "Glitter Jar" sung by Esme.
| 14a | 14a | "Achoo, Matey" | Lisa Kettle | February 2, 2019 | 114 | N/A |
Snugs has a bad case of the Sneezles and has to rest in bed, but he has a hard time staying put. Songs: "Belly Breathing" sung by Esme, "Let's Sail Away" sung by Esme, Roy, Snugs.
| 14b | 14b | "Beach Bummer" | Brian Hohlfeld | February 2, 2019 | 114 | N/A |
It's Simon's first time at the beach and Esme and Roy want to show him a great time. Songs: "Glitter Jar" sung by Esme, "Beach Artist" sung by Esme, Roy, Simon.
| 15a | 15a | "The Greatest Show in Monsterdale" | Jim Nolan | February 9, 2019 | 115 | N/A |
Esme and Roy must teach Hugo and Fig how to take turns sharing their Monster Sitters. Songs: "Glitter Jar" sung by Esme, "Let's Build a Circus" sung by Esme, Roy, Hugo, Fig.
| 15b | 15b | "The Amazing Outdoors" | Jennifer Hamburg | February 9, 2019 | 115 | N/A |
Esme and Roy Show Simon something as amazing as his favorite TV show: "The Outdoors". Songs: "Your Backyard is Exciting" sung by Esme, Roy, Simon, "Belly Breathing" sung by Esme.
| 16a | 16a | "Icky Pop" | Caitlin Hodson | February 16, 2019 | 116 | N/A |
Tillie gets a case of the Ickies and has a no-good, rotten day. Songs: "Self Talk" sung by Esme, "Bye Bye Ickies" sung by Esme, Roy, Tillie.
| 16b | 16b | "Dream Submarine" | Clark Stubbs | February 16, 2019 | 116 | N/A |
Tillie starts to see things in the dark. Songs: "Have No Fear" sung by Esme, Roy, "Glitter Jar" sung by Esme.
| 17a | 17a | "Special Delivery" | Rick Suvalle | February 23, 2019 | 117 | N/A |
The Monster Sitters take Fig to a birthday party, but she won't let go of the present. Songs: "Glitter Jar" sung by Esme, "Special Delivery" sing by Esme, Roy, Fig.
| 17b | 17b | "Fig Do It" | Laura Kleinbaum | February 23, 2019 | 117 | N/A |
Baby Fig wants to do everything herself, so Esme and Roy tries to teach her it's okay to ask for help. Songs: "Ask For Help" sung by Esme, Roy, Fig, "Belly Breathing" sung by Esme.
| 18a | 18a | "Top Dog" | Margaret Hoffman | March 2, 2019 | 118 | N/A |
Simon wants to teach his dog, Willie, a new trick for the Monsterdale Dog Show. Songs: "Learn a Trick" sung by Esme, Roy, Simon, "Belly Breathing" sung by Esme.
| 18b | 18b | "Picture Day Predicament" | Dan Danko | March 2, 2019 | 118 | N/A |
It's Picture Day and the Monster Sitters are walking Tillie to school, but keeping her clean along the way proves to be difficult. Songs: "Picture Day" sung by Esme, Roy, Tillie, "Self Talk" sung by Esme.
| 19a | 19a | "Grandmonster's Day" | Kristofer Wellman | March 9, 2019 | 119 | N/A |
Simon wants to find the perfect present for his Grammy on Grandmonster's Day. Songs: "Belly Breathing" sung by Esme, ”It's Gotta Be Grammy" sung by Esme, Roy, Simon.
| 19b | 19b | "Monster Bash Surprise" | Dana Starfield | March 9, 2019 | 119 | N/A |
The Monster Sitters plan to take Hugo and Fig to the Monster Bash, but Fig can't decide on a costume to wear. Songs: "Glitter Jar" sung by Esme, "You'll Be One of a Kind" sung by Esme, Roy, Hugo, Fig.
| 20a | 20a | "Air Snugs" | Guy Toubes | March 16, 2019 | 120 | N/A |
The Monster Sitters agree to help Ms. Muzzywump with her errands, but Snugs becomes too attached on an airplane ride. Songs: "Glitter Jar" sung by Esme, "Air Snugs" sung by Esme, Roy, Snugs.
| 20b | 20b | "A Mighty Shy Guy" | Lisa Kettle | March 16, 2019 | 120 | N/A |
Simon wants to play with Frank & Sid at the park, but feels too shy to introduce himself. Songs: "Hello" sung by Esme, Roy, Simon.
| 21a | 21a | "Ooga, Party of Six" | Becky Friedman | March 23, 2019 | 121 | N/A |
Hugo and Fig want to cook dinner for their parents, but the kitchen utensils are too dangerous for them to eat with. Songs: "Glitter Jar" sung by Esme, "Cafe Ooga Restaurant" sung by Esme, Roy, Hugo, Fig.
| 21b | 21b | "How Hugo Got His Toots Back" | Clark Stubbs | March 23, 2019 | 121 | N/A |
Hugo practices so much for the Noisy Parade that he loses his ability to toot. Songs: "Belly Breathing" sung by Esme, "The Noisy Parade" sung by Esme, Roy, Hugo.
| 22a | 22a | "Tilliesaurus" | Jennifer Hamburg | March 30, 2019 | 122 | N/A |
Tillie wants to play with real dinosaurs, but she doesn't know that they are extinct. When Esme and Roy finally tell her the truth, she gets extremely upset. Esme and Roy finally cheer her up by playing a game related to dinosaurs. Songs: "We Love to Be Dinosaurs" sung by Esme, Roy, Tillie.
| 22b | 22b | "Toy Share or Not Toy Share" | Rick Suvalle | March 30, 2019 | 122 | N/A |
Simon goes to Tillie's house for a play date, but she has a hard time sharing her toys because she thinks she won't get them back. Songs: "Belly Breathing" sung by Esme, "Check It Out" sung by Esme, Roy, Simon, Tillie.
| 23a | 23a | "Officer Tillie" | Keion Jackson | April 6, 2019 | 123 | N/A |
Tillie loves playing with her new police car, but she zooms around so fast that it's hard for her friends to play with her. Songs: "Officer Tillie" sung by Esme, Roy, Snugs, Tillie.
| 23b | 23b | "Fuzzy Ball" | Laura Kleinbaum | April 6, 2019 | 123 | N/A |
Snugs wants to learn a new game, but gives up when it starts to get difficult. Songs: "Go Snugs Go!" sung by Esme, Roy, Snugs, "Glitter Jar" sung by Esme.
| 24a | 24a | "A Rocky Business" | Margaret Hoffman | April 13, 2019 | 124 | N/A |
When Hugo runs a crafts store and Fig starts a competing business, the Monster Sitters try to get the little monsters to work together. Songs: "Glitter Jar" sung by Esme, "Just Me and You" sung by Esme, Roy, Fig, Hugo.
| 24b | 24b | "Bedtime for Hugo" | Dustin Ferrer | April 13, 2019 | 124 | N/A |
Hugo wants to keep playing with his Monster Sitters at bedtime. Can they find a way to help him rest so that he can play all day tomorrow? Songs: "The Bedtime" sung by Esme, Roy, Hugo, "Belly Breathing" sung by Esme.
| 25a | 25a | "Stroller Derby" | Becky Friedman | April 20, 2019 | 125 | N/A |
When Hugo forgets his lunchbox, Esme and Roy decide to take it to him at school, but Fig doesn't want to get in her stroller. Songs: "Glitter Jar" sung by Esme, "School Bus" sung by Esme, Roy, Fig.
| 25b | 25b | "The Inside Job" | Clark Stubbs | April 20, 2019 | 125 | N/A |
Snugs wants to have fun at the park, but it starts to get really, really chilly. Can Esme and Roy convince him to go inside and warm up? Songs: "Belly Breathing" sung by Esme, "Bring the Outside In" sung by Esme, Roy, Snugs.
| 26a | 26a | "Party Time" | Kristofer Wellman | April 27, 2019 | 126 | N/A |
Esme and Roy decide to throw a party when they learn that five little monsters are coming over, but things don't go according to plan. Songs: "Belly Breathing" sung by Roy, "Our Favorite Monster-sitters" sung by Simon, Tillie, Fig, Hugo and Snugs.
| 26b | 26b | "The Really Really Big Race" | Leah Gotcsik | April 27, 2019 | 126 | N/A |
Simon comes to Tillie's house for a big race, but soon discovers that he doesn't like racing. Songs: "Glitter Jar" sung by Esme, "The Really Really Big Race" sung by Esme, Roy, Tillie and Simon.

=== Season 2 (2020–21) ===
| No. overall | No. in season | Title | Written by | Original release date | PBS Kids air date |
|---|---|---|---|---|---|
| 27 | 1 | "A Dino-Mite Lunch" | Jennifer Hamburg | June 25, 2020 | March 6, 2021 |
| 27 | 1 | "Baby Hugo" | Dustin Ferrer | June 25, 2020 | March 6, 2021 |
Esme and Roy try to get Tillie to eat her lunch. But when she refuses, she gets instantly tired./ Hugo acts like a baby because he wants to do the things his baby sister Fig does, like being fed food by an adult.
| 28 | 2 | "To Cupcake with Love" | Becky Friedman | June 25, 2020 | March 7, 2021 |
| 28 | 2 | "A True Monsterpiece" | Margaret Hoffman | June 25, 2020 | March 7, 2021 |
Esme and Roy try to get Snugs to not eat the cupcakes he made before he goes to the park. / Simon tries to paint the perfect painting of his dog, Willie, but gets frustrated when he messes up every time.
| 29 | 3 | "The Book Bind" | Lisa Kettle | June 25, 2020 | March 13, 2021 |
| 29 | 3 | "Don't Bug Me" | Clark Stubbs | June 25, 2020 | March 13, 2021 |
Esme and Roy help Tille find a new book after a book she was going to check out gets checked out. / Esme and Roy try to show Sid that bugs are nothing to be afraid of.
| 30 | 4 | "The Swoozle News" | Amy Steinberg | June 25, 2020 | March 14, 2021 |
| 30 | 4 | "Throw and Tell" | Dan Danko | June 25, 2020 | March 14, 2021 |
Simon wants to tell Grammy activities he did. / Esme and Roy try to stop Fig from throwing stuff.
| 31 | 5 | "A Very Sleepy Tillie" | Laura Kleinbaum | June 25, 2020 | March 20, 2021 |
| 31 | 5 | "Personal Space" | Max Beaudry & Francisco Paredes | June 25, 2020 | March 20, 2021 |
Esme and Roy try to get Tille to sleep for her family party. / Esme and Roy try to get Fig to play in Hugo and Frank’s game.
| 32 | 6 | "Snugs to the Rescue" | Caitlin Hodson | June 25, 2020 | March 27, 2021 |
| 32 | 6 | "Lickety Split" | Amy Keating Rogers | June 25, 2020 | March 27, 2021 |
Snugs is afraid of playing superheroes after he hurts himself. / Tillie and Snugs play two games at the same time, but each needs Esme and Roy.
| 33 | 7 | "Not Kitten Around" | Margaret Hoffman | June 25, 2020 | April 3, 2021 |
| 33 | 7 | "The Show Must Go On" | Jennifer Hamburg | June 25, 2020 | April 3, 2021 |
| 34 | 8 | "It's in the Bag" | Amy Steinberg | June 25, 2020 | April 10, 2021 |
| 34 | 8 | "Are We There Yet?" | Clark Stubbs | June 25, 2020 | April 10, 2021 |
| 35 | 9 | "Princess of Play" | Dustin Ferrer | August 6, 2020 | April 17, 2021 |
| 36 | 10 | "Sound Reasoning" | Mike Nawrocki | August 6, 2020 | April 24, 2021 |
| 36 | 10 | "Big Brother Snugs" | Becky Friedman | August 6, 2020 | April 24, 2021 |
Simon tries to watch a scary movie/Snugs finds out that he's going to get a new baby sibling
| 37 | 11 | "Warm and Fuzzy Day" | Andrew Blanchette | August 6, 2020 | May 1, 2021 |
| 37 | 11 | "Think Big" | Margaret Hoffman | August 6, 2020 | May 1, 2021 |
Sid and Lucy celebrate "Warm and Fuzzy Day," but things don't go according to plan/Snugs introduces Esme and Roy to his favorite toys, but are extremely worried because the toys have small pieces and his baby brother, Fuzzy would end up putting the toys in his mouth.
| 38 | 12 | "Snuggle Bunny" | Amy Steinberg | August 6, 2020 | May 8, 2021 |
| 38 | 12 | "Blown Away" | Becky Wangberg & Sarah Eisenberg | August 6, 2020 | May 8, 2021 |
| 39 | 13 | "So Long Stuff" | Jennifer Hamburg | August 6, 2020 | May 15, 2021 |
| 39 | 13 | "An Open Book" | Aaron Simpson | August 6, 2020 | May 15, 2021 |
| 40 | 14 | "Holiday Spirit" | Dustin Ferrer | December 10, 2020 | December 11, 2021 (Cartoon Network) |
| 40 | 14 | "Snow Worries" | Amy Steinberg | December 10, 2020 | December 11, 2021 (Cartoon Network) |
| 41 | 15 | "The Tooting Twosome" | Clark Stubbs | February 4, 2021 | TBA |
| 41 | 15 | "Cheer Up, Pup!" | Dustin Ferrer | February 4, 2021 | TBA |
| 42 | 16 | "Can't Touch This" | Eric Shaw | February 4, 2021 | TBA |
| 42 | 16 | "Mission Bedtime" | Clark Stubbs | February 4, 2021 | TBA |
Fig really wants to touch everything, but Esme and Roy is worried because some of the stuff she touches might be too dangerous/Simon really wants to play, even though its bedtime
| 43 | 17 | "Flying High" | Amy Steinberg | February 4, 2021 | TBA |
| 43 | 17 | "Hugo the Entertainer" | Jennifer Hamburg & Ray DeLaurentis | February 4, 2021 | TBA |
| 44 | 18 | "Dream Team" | Becky Friedman | February 4, 2021 | TBA |
| 44 | 18 | "It's a Jungle Out There" | Carly Ciarrocchi | February 4, 2021 | TBA |
| 45 | 19 | "Swoozlepox" | Kevin Hopps | February 4, 2021 | TBA |
| 45 | 19 | "Balloon Blues" | Aaron Mendelsohn | February 4, 2021 | TBA |
| 46 | 20 | "Tillie Unplugged" | Laura Kleinbaum | February 4, 2021 | TBA |
| 46 | 20 | "Starring Simon" | Jennifer Hamburg | February 4, 2021 | TBA |
| 47 | 21 | "Doctor Drama" | Scott Gray | February 4, 2021 | TBA |
| 47 | 21 | "Dumpling's Birthday" | Clark Stubbs | February 4, 2021 | TBA |
| 48 | 22 | "Sofishticated Taste" | Becky Friedman | February 4, 2021 | TBA |
| 48 | 22 | "Knight Rider" | Kevin Hopps | February 4, 2021 | TBA |
| 49 | 23 | "Unicorn Tillie" | Maxwell Nicoll | February 4, 2021 | TBA |
| 49 | 23 | "Boxed In" | Billy Lopez | February 4, 2021 | TBA |
| 50 | 24 | "Monsterpet Badge" | Mike Nawrocki | February 4, 2021 | TBA |
| 50 | 24 | "The Long Goodnight" | Laura Kleinbaum | February 4, 2021 | TBA |
| 51 | 25 | "Best Day Ever" | Lucas Mills | February 4, 2021 | TBA |
| 51 | 25 | "The Waiting Game" | Scott Gray | February 4, 2021 | TBA |
| 52 | 26 | "Fangsgiving" | Becky Friedman | February 4, 2021 | TBA |
| 52 | 26 | "The Tillie Show" | Kevin Hopps | February 4, 2021 | TBA |
Simon gets upset when the annual Monsterdale Thanksgiving Parade is cancelled due to an explosion of slime all over Monsterdale/Snugs and Tillie have a playdate, but Tillie's interrupting makes Snugs upset.
