= Anthony Meindl =

American actor and comedian (born 1968)

- Born: Anthony Paul Meindl; January 14, 1968 (age 58); LaPorte, Indiana, U.S.
- Occupations: Actor; director; screenwriter; author; comedian; acting coach
- Website: www.anthonymeindl.com

Anthony Paul Meindl (born January 14, 1968) is an American director, screenwriter, actor, author, and comedian. He is known for the direct-to-video series Hard Hat Harry, and for serving as the artistic director of Anthony Meindl's Actor Workshop in Los Angeles, California.

== Early life ==
Meindl was born in La Porte, Indiana. In early adulthood, Meindl lived in New York City, where he pursued theatre work, and later spent time in London before moving to Los Angeles in 1998.

== Career ==
=== Acting coach ===
In the 1990s, Meindl starred in Hard Hat Harry, a children's show introducing young viewers to vehicles and construction equipment. In 1998, he appeared in an episode of Will & Grace, "The Truth About Will & Dogs". In 2005, he appeared in the mystery comedy Death of a Saleswoman.

Meindl founded and directs Anthony Meindl's Actor Workshop (AMAW) in 1998, which operates locations in North America (Los Angeles, Atlanta, Chicago, New York City, Toronto, Santa Fe, Vancouver), Europe (London, Copenhagen), Africa (Cape Town), and Australia (Sydney). The workshop emphasizes emotional authenticity and character development.

He is also the host of the In The Moment podcast, which discusses acting and art, and features interviews with casting directors, actors, and industry professionals.

=== Director and producer ===
His first feature screenplay, The Wonder Girls, won the grand prize for a feature screenplay in the Slamdance Film Festival in 2007. Meindl was nominated for Best Director at the LA Weekly Theater Awards for two consecutive years, for Best Comedy (Swimming in the Shallows) and Best Drama (Dogs Barking).

Meindl's first directed feature film was Birds of a Feather (2011). The film received Best Director awards at the 2012 Downtown LA Film Festival, and the 2013 Golden Door International Film Festival of Jersey City. It also won the Spirit of the Festival Award at the 2012 Honolulu Rainbow Film Festival.

In 2019, Meindl directed the short film Is This You, Too?, written by and starring Barbara Howlin.

== Authorship ==
Meindl authored five books: At Left Brain Turn Right, a spiritual self-help book; Alphabet Soup for Grown-Ups; Book the F#king Job!; Book the F#king Job for Teens; and You Knew When You Were 2, a memoir.

== Filmography ==
Acting
Year	Title	Role	Notes
1994	All My Children (TV series)	Waiter	TV series, 1 episode: "Episode dated 20 January 1994"
1995	Hard Hat Harry	Hard Hat Harry (credited as Anthony Paul)	Children's TV Series, 2 episodes: "Real Life Fire Trucks For Kids" and "All About... Trucks"
1997	David Searching	Diner Waiter	Independent film
1998	Will & Grace	Cute Guy (credited as Anthony Paul Meindl)	TV series, 1 episode: "The Truth About Will and Dogs"
1999	Any Day Now	Waiter	TV series, 1 episode: "Say Something"
1999	Behind the Life of Chris Gaines	Ryan Duffy	TV movie
1999	Family Law	Scott Kaplan	TV series, 1 episode: "The Fourth Trimester"
2000	Get Your Stuff	Eric	Independent Film
2006	Death of a Saleswoman	Ethan Capperlog	Independent Film
2011	Birds of a Feather	Mark Daniels	Independent Film/TV Movie
2018	Sum of Us	Tony (self)	Feature Film
2019	Where We Go from Here	Ricky	Feature Film
