= Beurre, œuf, fromage =

French food acronym

Beurre, œuf, fromage (butter, egg, cheese; BOF) is an old French acronym by the food trade from the central food halls of Les Halles to creamery retailers that sold the three staples of the French diet—butter, eggs and cheese—and were referred to as Les BOF. Its meaning became a pejorative term in France during the German Occupation in World War II and the following years after the war, when ration cards were much sought-after on the black market.

By extension, BOF came to designate a person making money on the black market during this period. The Jean Dutourds novel The Best Butter (Au bon beurre), considered the best known and most-cited work on the black market in occupied France, features the satirical adventures of a BOF couple, the Poissonard family who work in a Paris dairy shop during the German occupation and think only of getting rich.

In the immediate post-war period, the black market's capture of food shortages continued, triggering demonstrations throughout 1947, notably that of November 12 in Marseille, during which a young 19-year-old worker, Vincent Voulant, was shot dead and four other demonstrators, also victims of gunfire from the same night bar, were seriously wounded, two of whom underwent surgery and were still in critical condition the following day.

== See also ==
- Black market in wartime France
