= National Sporting Goods Association =

American trade organization

- Established: 1929
- Type: Industry trade group
- Headquarters: Downers Grove, United States
- Field: Sporting goods
- Website: Official website

The National Sporting Goods Association (NSGA) is an American industry trade group representing retailers, wholesalers and manufacturers of sports equipment.

== History ==
On May 26, 1929, the NSGA was formed when the Sporting Goods Dealer's Association of South Carolina merged with the Missouri-based Sporting Goods Distributors Association, to create the Sporting Goods Distributors Organization. The name was changed to the National Sporting Goods Distributors Association in 1930, followed by the National Sporting Goods Association in 1936.

== Gender representation ==
As of the 2023, the NSGA's Hall of Fame has awarded a total of 181 people are listed in the Hall of Fame, of whom 171 are male and 10 are female.
