= Deer hunting =

Practice/activity of hunting deer

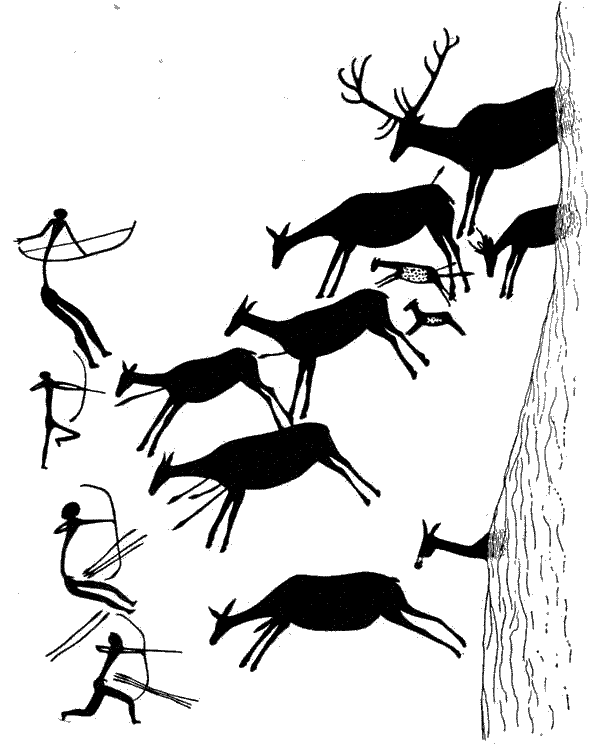
A Neolithic painting of deer hunting from Spain

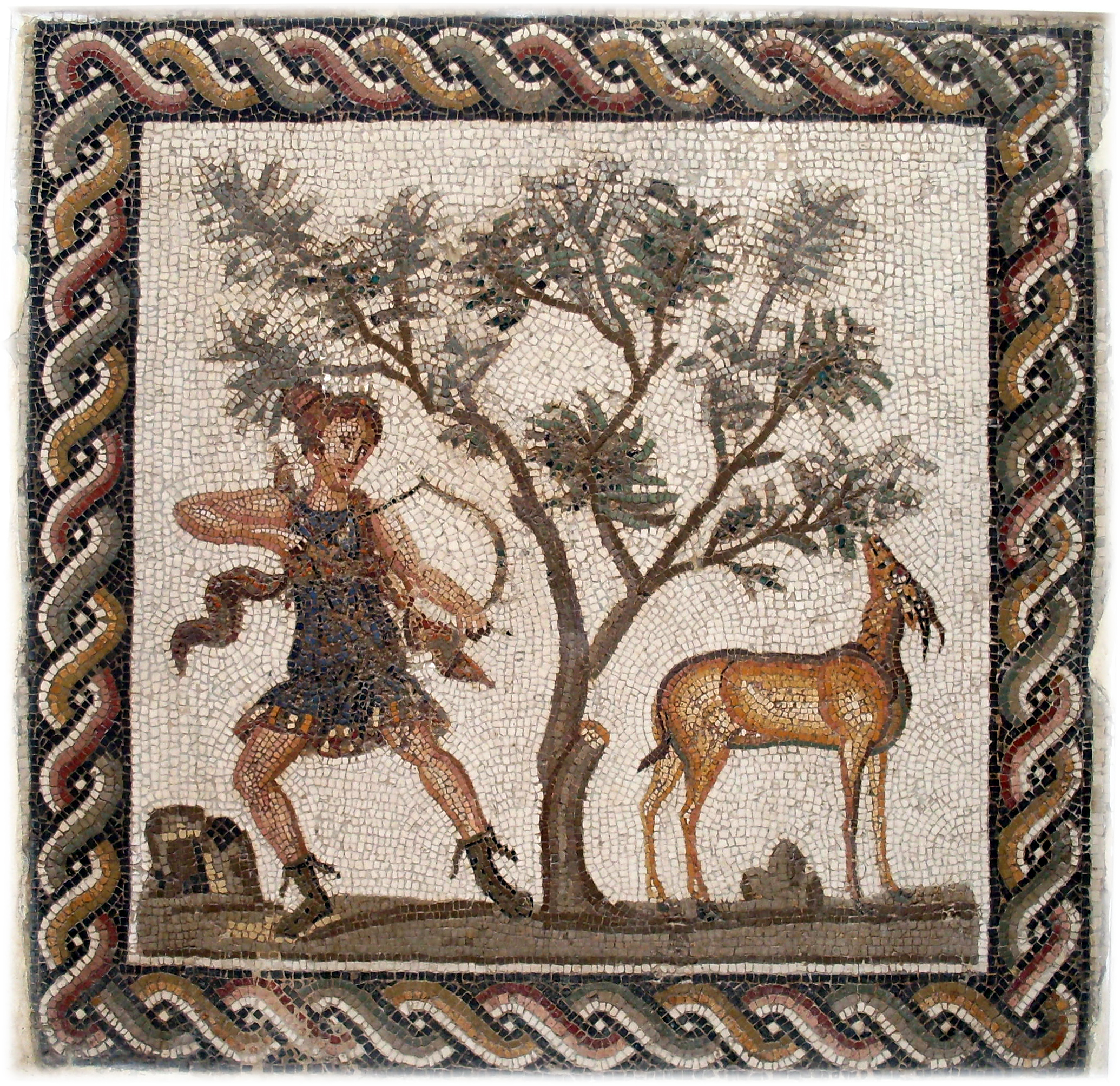
A Roman mosaic depicting the goddess Diana deer hunting

Deer hunting is the act of hunting deer for meat and sport, and, formerly, for producing buckskin hides, an activity which dates back hundreds of thousands of years. Venison, the name for deer meat, is a nutritious and natural food source of animal protein that can be obtained through deer hunting. There are many different types of deer around the world that are hunted for their meat. For sport, often hunters try to kill deer with the largest and most antlers to score them using inches. There are two different categories of antlers. They are typical and nontypical. They measure tine length, beam length, and beam mass by each tine. They will add all these measurements up to get a score. This score is the score without deductions. Deductions occur when the opposite tine is not the same length as its opposite. That score is the deducted score.

Hunting deer is a regulated activity in many territories. In the United States, a state government agency such as a Department of Fish and Wildlife (DFW) or Department of Natural Resources (DNR) oversees the regulations. In the United Kingdom, it is illegal to use bows or rifles chambered in bores smaller than .243 caliber (6 mm) for hunting.

== Australia ==
In Australia, there are six species of deer that are available to hunt. These are fallow deer, sambar, red deer, rusa, chital, and hog deer.

== New Zealand ==
New Zealand has had 10 species of deer (Cervidae) introduced. From the 1850s, red deer were liberated, followed by fallow, sambar, wapiti, sika, rusa, and whitetail. The introduced herds of axis and moose failed to grow, and have become extinct. In the absence of predators to control populations, deer were thought to be a pest due to their effect on native vegetation. From the 1930s, the government employed professional hunters to cull the deer population. Market hunting for deer hides was a significant activity during the 1940s and 1950s, and meat hunting from helicopters continues today, with the main market for wild venison being Europe. Deer hunting in New Zealand is a popular recreational activity, organised and advocated for at the national level by the New Zealand Deerstalkers' Association.

== United Kingdom and Republic of Ireland ==
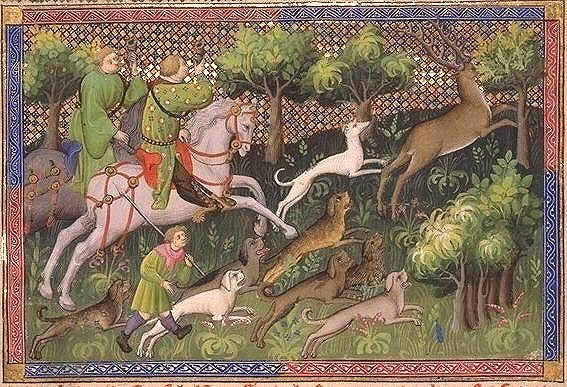
A depiction of deer hunting with hounds from a 15th-century version of The Hunting Book of Gaston Phébus

The term "deer hunting" is used in North America for the shooting of deer, but in the United Kingdom and Ireland, the term generally refers to the pursuit of deer with scent hounds, with unarmed followers typically on horseback.

There are six species of deer in the UK: red deer, roe deer, fallow deer, Sika deer, Reeves muntjac deer, and Chinese water deer, as well as hybrids of these deer. All are hunted to a degree reflecting their relative population either as sport or for culling. Closed seasons for deer vary by species. The practice of declaring a closed season in England dates back to medieval times, when it was called fence month and commonly lasted from June 9 to July 9, though the actual dates varied. It is illegal to use bows to hunt any wild animal in the UK under the Wildlife and Countryside Act 1981.

UK deer stalkers, if supplying venison (in fur) to game dealers, butchers and restaurants, need to hold a Lantra level 2 large game meat hygiene certificate. Courses are run by organisations such as the British Association for Shooting and Conservation and this qualification is also included within the Level 1 deer stalking certificate. If supplying venison for public consumption (meat), the provider must have a fully functioning and clean larder that meets FSA standards and must register as a food business with the local authority.

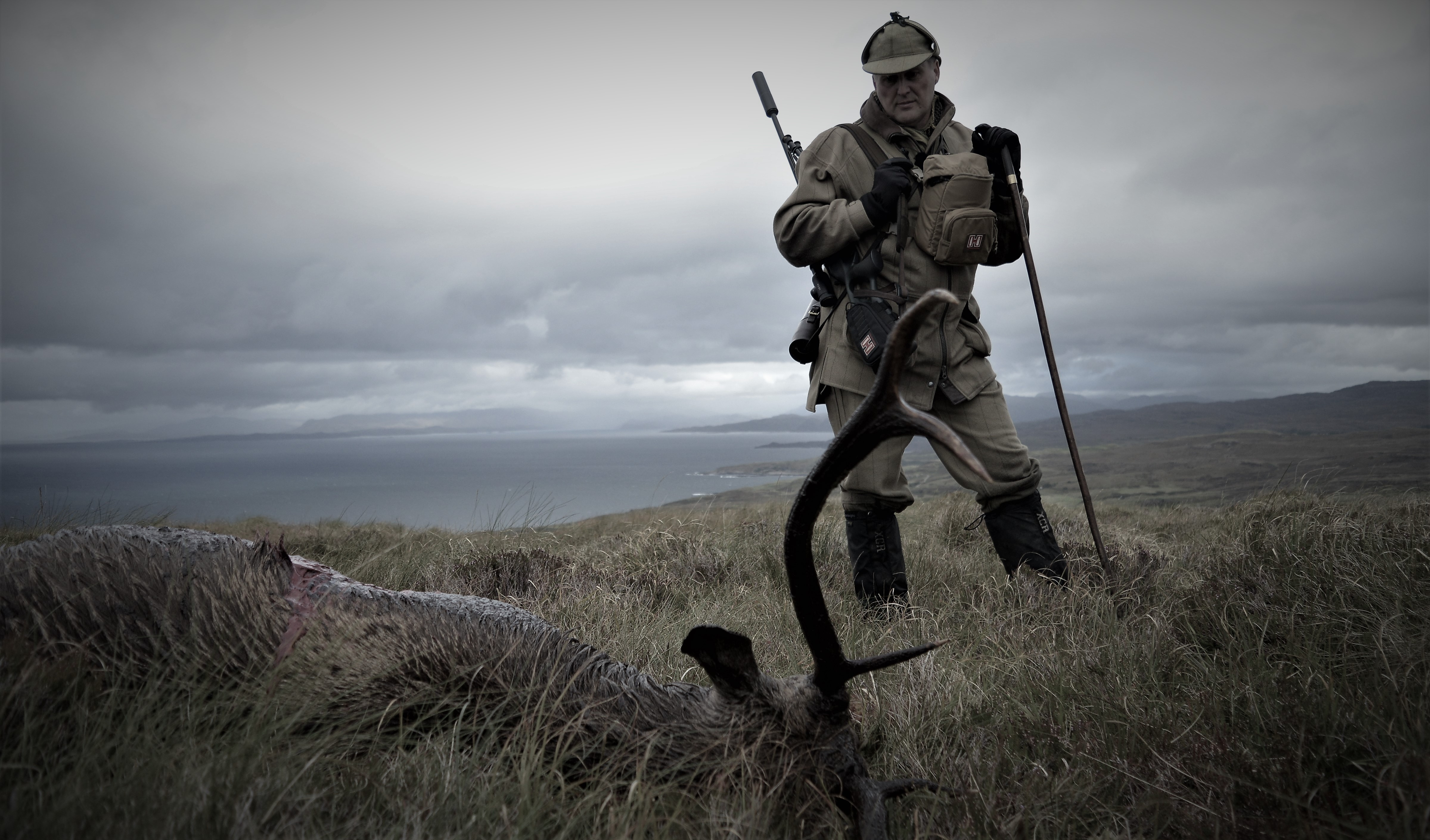
Professional stalker standing next to a red deer stag shot on Ardnamurchan Estate in the Scottish Highlands

The vast majority of deer hunted in the UK are stalked. The phrase deer hunting is used to refer (in England and Wales) to the traditional practice of chasing deer with packs of hounds, currently illegal under the Hunting Act 2004.

In the late nineteenth and twentieth centuries, there were several packs of staghounds hunting "carted deer" in England and Ireland. Carted deer were red deer kept in captivity for the sole purpose of being hunted and recaptured alive. More recently, there were three packs of staghounds hunting wild red deer of both sexes on or around Exmoor and the New Forest Buckhounds hunting fallow deer bucks in the New Forest, the latter disbanding in 1997.

The practice of hunting with hounds, other than using two hounds to flush deer to be shot by waiting marksmen, has been banned in the UK since 2005; to date, two people have been convicted of breaking the law.

There is one pack of stag hounds in the Republic of Ireland and one in Northern Ireland, the former operating under a licence to hunt carted deer.

== United States ==
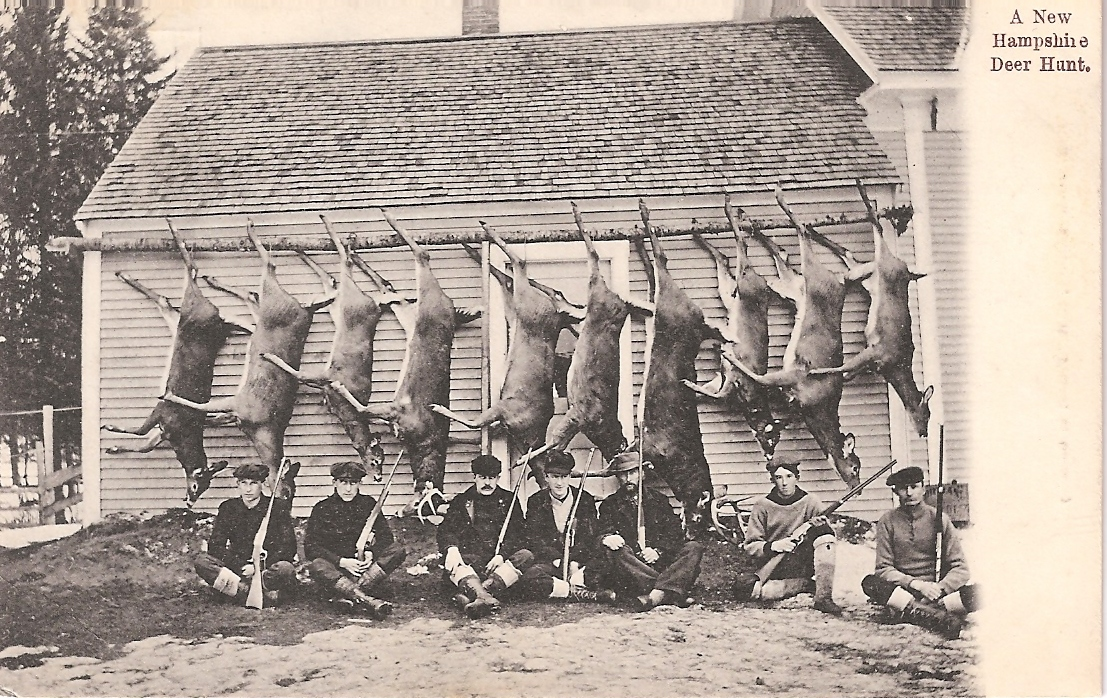
A New Hampshire deer hunt circa 1910

The two main species of deer found in the United States are mule deer and white-tailed deer. Mule deer are mostly found west of the Rocky Mountains, but can also be found as far east as parts of North and South Dakota, while whitetails generally occur only to the east of the Rockies. Mule deer have a black-tipped tail which is proportionally smaller than that of the white-tailed deer. The male deer or bucks grow antlers annually. The mule deer have taller skinnier tines on their antlers where white-tailed deer typically have shorter thicker tines. White-tailed bucks are slightly smaller than mule deer bucks. Whitetail deer excel in various habitats including forests as well as suburban territories, and are very much adaptable to multiple environments. Both of the species lose their antlers in January, and regrow the antlers during the following summer beginning in June. Although both species are found in the United States, where they are found is vastly different. Mule deer are found in the western United States in the foothills of the mountains.

As their antlers become fully developed, they will start to shed their velvet. Velvet is vascularised tissue that is a furry skin-like material that covers the growing antlers. If the antlers are damaged while they are in velvet they can cause nontypical features due to the soft nature of the antler tissue while growing. The velvet will fall off of the deer when their antlers start to harden in late summer to early fall to get ready for mating season in the winter. If the velvet doesn't fall off on its own they will make a "rub" on a small tree. This is when they rub their antlers to both mark territory and to take the remaining velvet off.

Mating season (referred to as the "rut") is, typically, a good time for hunting deer and which usually takes place at the end of October and leading into November. During this season, the bucks are often up on their feet more to try to "lockdown" does.

There are many different types of strategies employed when deer hunting. These strategies often depend on the time of year too. One of the most successful early and late season strategies is hunting over a food source. The hunter must know his state laws for baiting or feeding deer while hunting, as each state differs, and policies may also vary within a given state. (Note: For example, Kentucky bans any type of baiting, defined as "grain, feed, mineral blocks, salt blocks, and other baits used to attract deer" within the Jackson Purchase, the state's only region where chronic wasting disease has been detected. Baiting is legal elsewhere in the state. Food plots, as well as feed stations and mineral blocks for domestic livestock, are legal even in the Purchase, and hunters may use products that deer do not consume.) This can be done multiple ways. One way that can be very successful if done correctly is by growing a food plot. Some of the popular food plots for deer are clover, alfalfa, turnips, and radishes. Another way as mentioned before is baiting deer. This is often done with corn or a mineral block, such as a salt-lick, and where the hunter sits perched in a higher elevation some distance away, awaiting the deer's visit. If this were done at night, a miner's acetylene lamp, or an electric spotlight, was placed near the mineral block so as to see the animal when it approaches. Another strategy is hunting a "rub" or "scrape" line. This strategy is often used closer to the "rut" season. Bucks often travel in the same areas over and over again. This tactic would be used to try to catch a buck up on its feet going from bedding to food or vice versa. Placing a tree stand on the trail or using a ground blind is another tactic used by bow and firearm hunters to camouflage themselves while hunting deer.

Other ways of hunting deer include the stalking and still-hunting methods. This way is very difficult for a beginner, as well as an experienced hunter. This takes quite a bit of practice to become successful at. All conditions must be right for this method to work. A hunter must be quiet, the ground must be soft, there cannot be crunchy leaves on the ground, etc... . People often use tracking when trying to stalk deer. This works best with fresh snow as you can see the deer tracks that are recent. Another method used when hunting is simply sitting and waiting for a deer, whether in a tree stand or a ground blind. This method is very difficult for some people because of how long a hunter must sit still for hours at times. There is a combination of these hunting methods which has been used by most hunters. This method is called "driving". In "driving", there are people who try to move deer in a certain direction by walking through the woods in the direction they want the deer to move. While they are trying to move deer, people are sitting in a certain place that has been designated and expected for the deer to move through. The people shooting try to shoot the deer as they go through that area. This method is very successful in getting deer on their feet to move.

The Chickasaw and Choctaw Indians of North America traditionally made use of the decoy method of hunting the white-tailed deer.

They hunt like all their neighbors with the skin and frontal bone of a deer's head, dried and stretched on elastic chips; the horns they scoup [sic] out very curiously, employing so much patience on this, that such a head and antlers often do not exceed ten or twelve ounces; they fix this on the left hand, and imitating the motions of the deer in sight, they decoy them within sure shot.

— Bernard Romans, Natural History of East and West Florida

The motion of the deer that was imitated was the manner in which it feeds and looks around in a very natural way.

=== State government regulation ===
Methods of pursuing game for wild meat and corresponding seasons are subject to regulation by state governments and therefore vary from state to state. A state government agency such as a Department of Fish and Wildlife (DFW) or Department of Natural Resources (DNR) oversees the regulations.

Deer hunting seasons vary across the United States. In game zone 3 in the state of South Carolina, deer hunting season starts August 15 and runs through January 1. Some seasons in states such as Florida and Kentucky start as early as September and can go all the way until February like in Texas. The length of the season is often based on the health and population of the deer herd, in addition to the number of hunters expected to be participating in the deer hunt. The duration of deer hunting seasons can also vary by county within a state, as in Kentucky. In the case of South Carolina, the season varies by SCDNR region. Each region has multiple counties. The DFW will also create specific time frames within the season where the number of hunters able to hunt is limited, which is known as a controlled hunt.

The DFW may also break the deer-hunting season into different time periods where only certain weapons are permitted: bows only (compound, recurve, and crossbows), modern firearms (rifles and shotguns) or black-powder muzzleloaders. (Some states, such as Kentucky, consider only compound and recurve bows as "bows" for hunting regulation purposes, and have special seasons for crossbows.) For example, during a bows-only season, in many areas a hunter would be limited to the use of a bow and the use of any firearm would be prohibited until that specific season opens, and in some areas a crossbow can only be used during a dedicated season for that weapon. Similarly, during a muzzleloader season, use of modern firearms is almost always prohibited. However, in many states, the archery season (at least for compound and recurve bows) completely overlaps all firearms seasons; in those locations, bowhunters may take deer during a firearms season.

Some states also have restrictions on hunting of antlered or antlerless deer. For example, Kentucky allows the taking of antlerless deer during any deer season in most of the state, but in certain areas allows only antlered deer to be taken during parts of deer season.

== Gallery ==
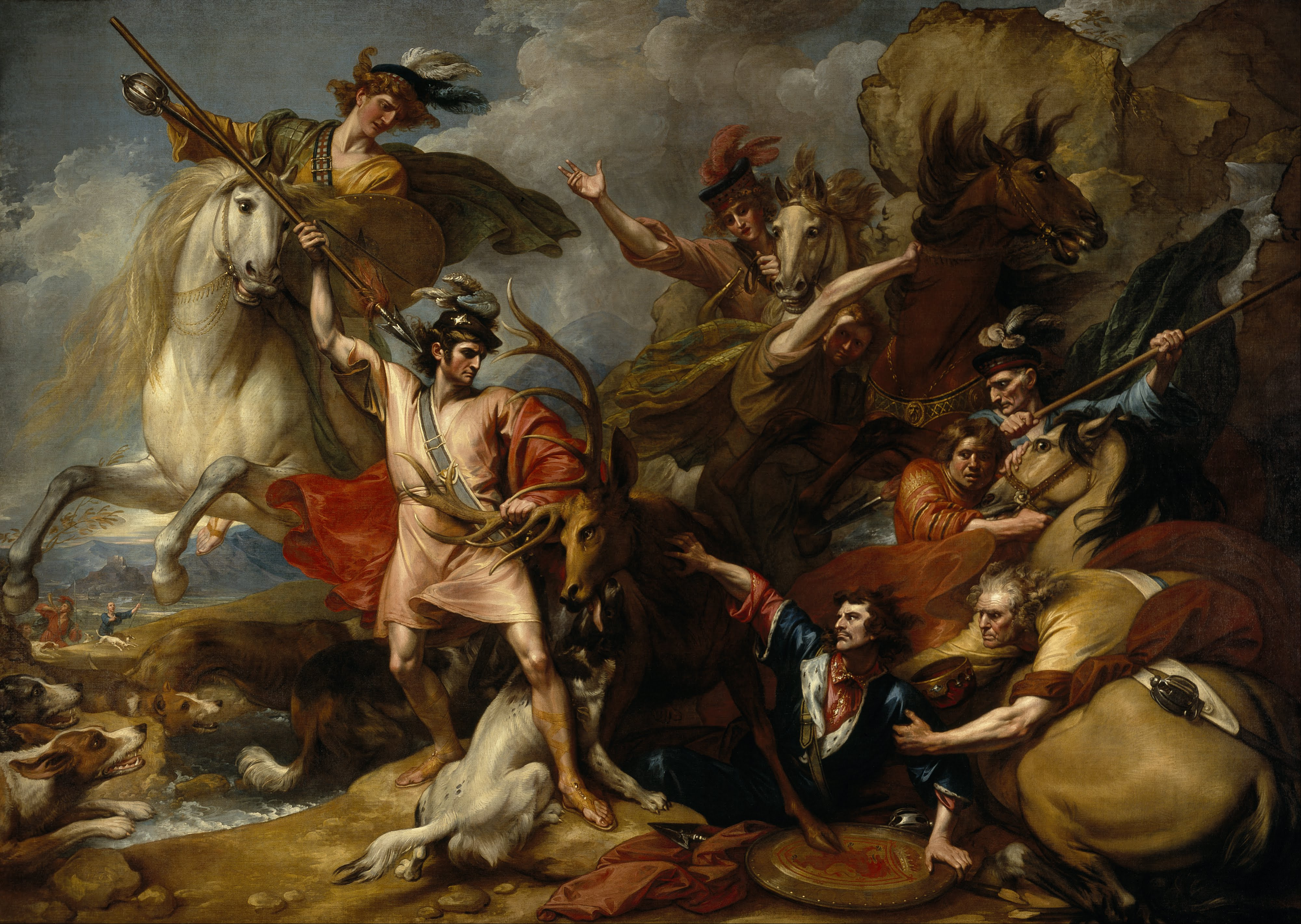
Alexander III of Scotland Rescued from the Fury of a Stag by Benjamin West, 1786

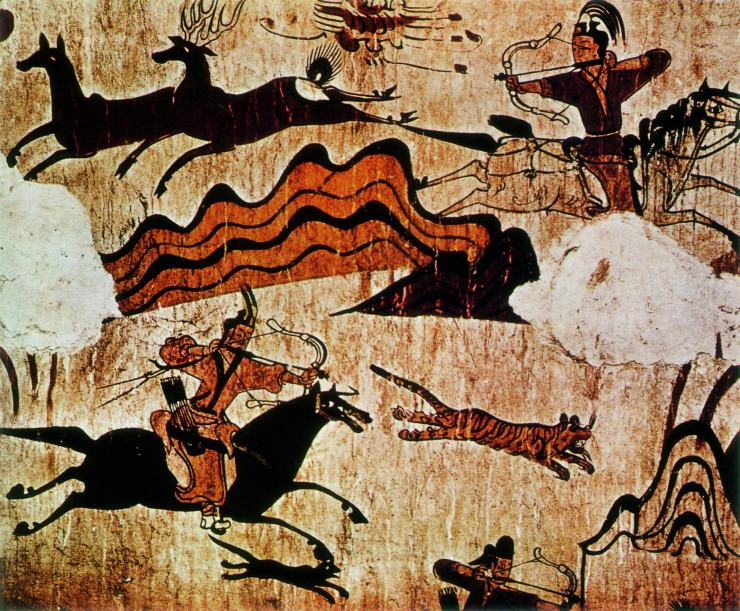
The Goguryeo tomb mural of hunting from Ji'an

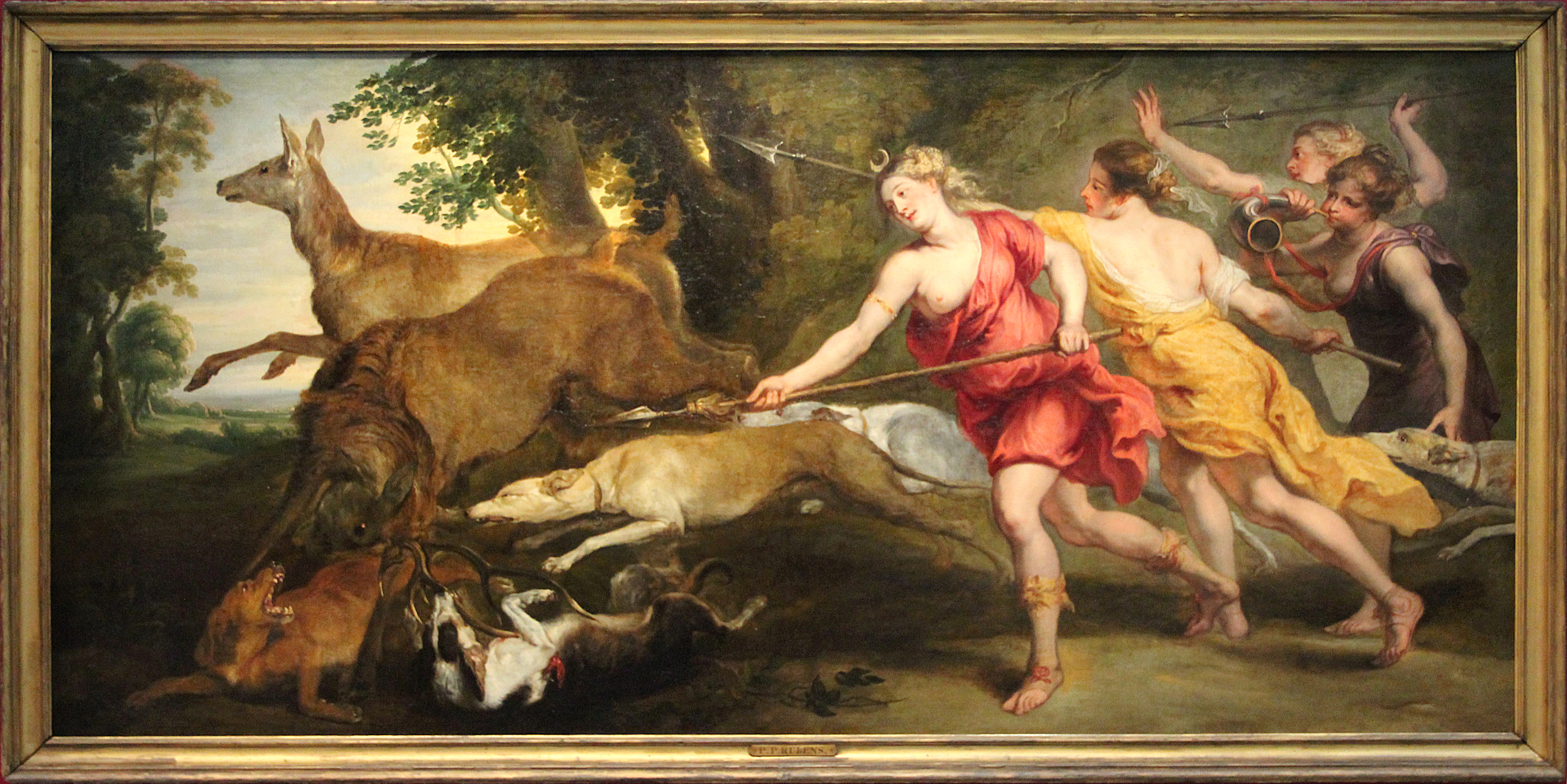
A painting of the goddess Diana deer hunting by Peter Rubens

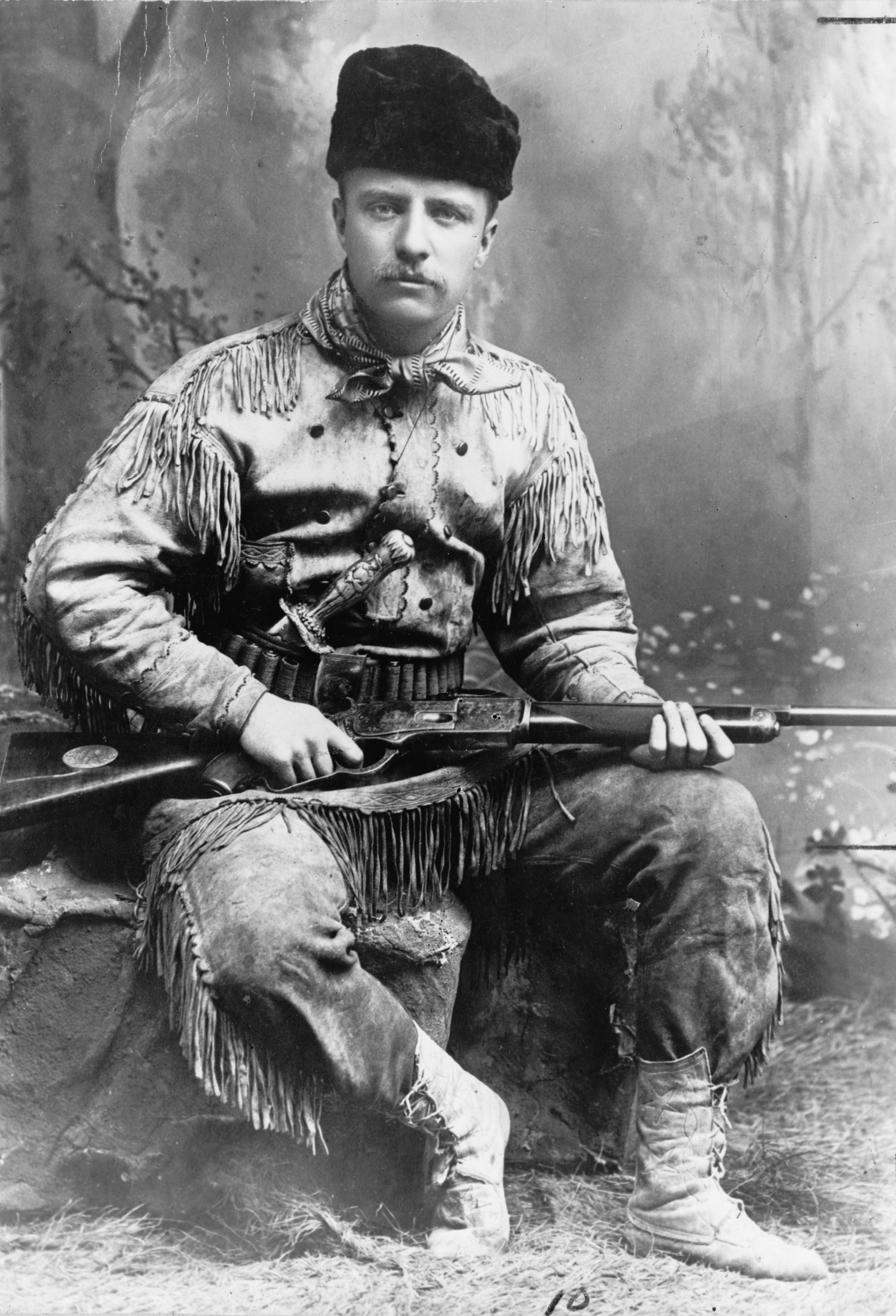
Theodore Roosevelt in 1885 with his highly decorated deer-skin hunting suit, and Tiffany-carved hunting knife and rifle

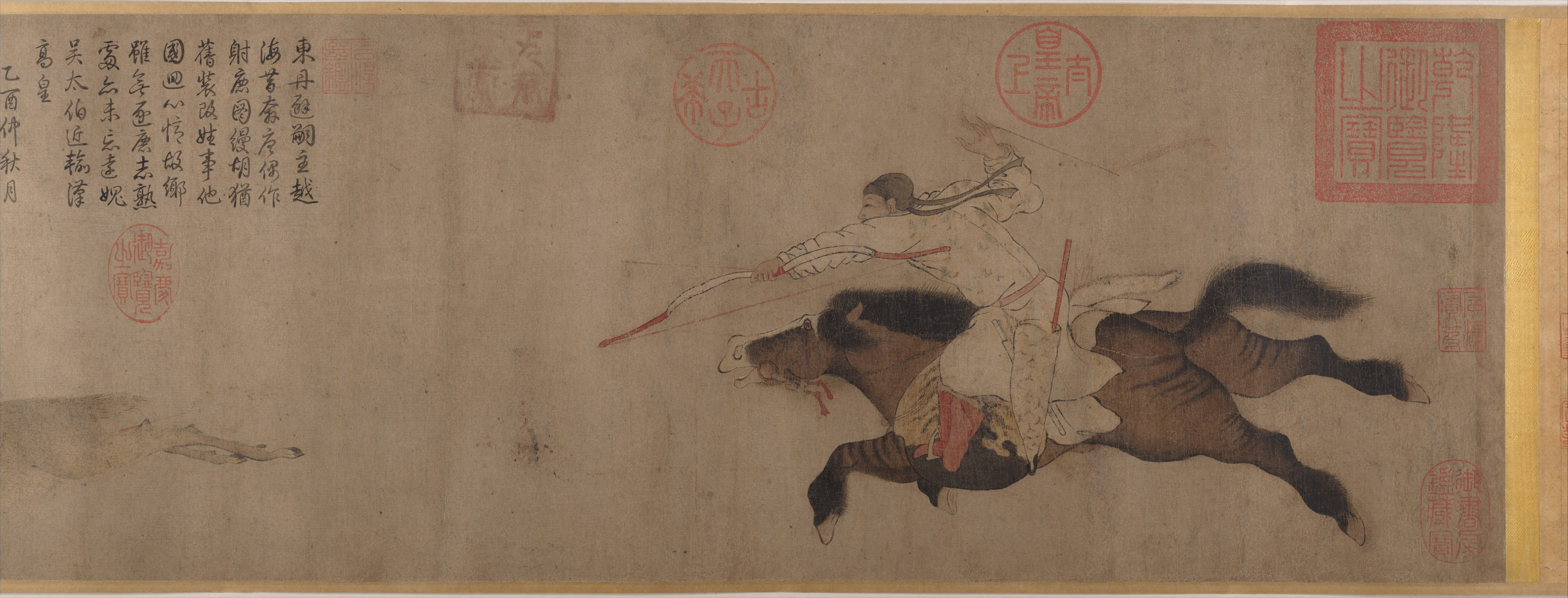
Stag Hunt (attributed to Huang Zongdao), ca. 1120, Metropolitan Museum of Art

== See also ==
- Big Buck Hunter
- Deer Act 1980 (in the UK)
- Deer farm
- Deer horn
- Deer day
- Deer Hunter - video game
- Deer Avenger - video game
- Deerskin trade
- TheHunter - video game
- Hole in the Horn Buck
- James Jordan Buck
- Reindeer hunting in Greenland
- Venison
