= Virtual fencing (disambiguation) =

Virtual fencing may refer to:

- Virtual fencing (livestock), the use of GPS-enabled collars and other technologies to contain or manage livestock without physical fences.
- Wildlife virtual fencing, roadside systems that use lights, sounds, or other deterrents to reduce wildlife–vehicle collisions without physical barriers.
