= Wildlife–vehicle collision =

Animal mortality in traffic

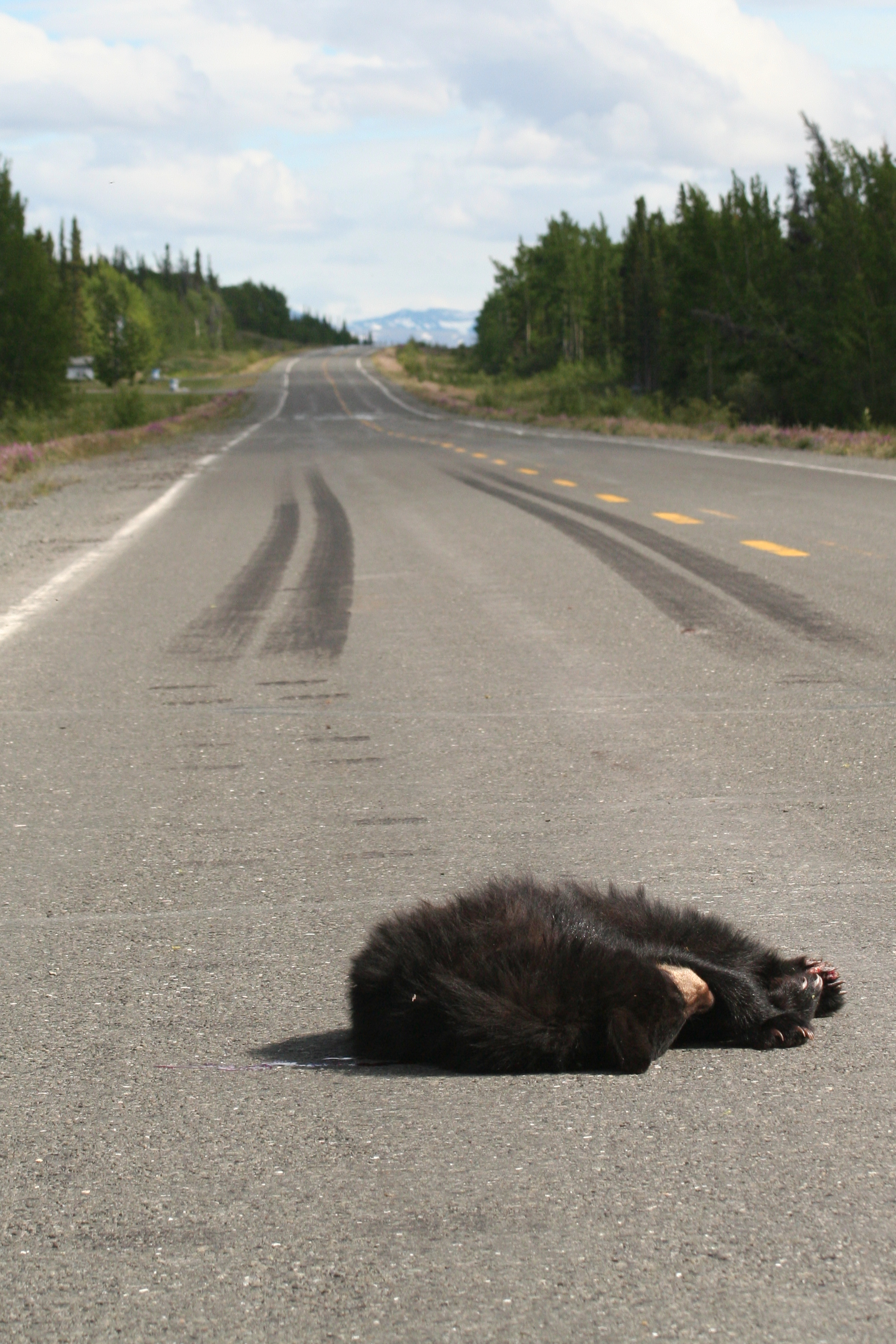
Roadkilled black bear in Kluane National Park and Reserve

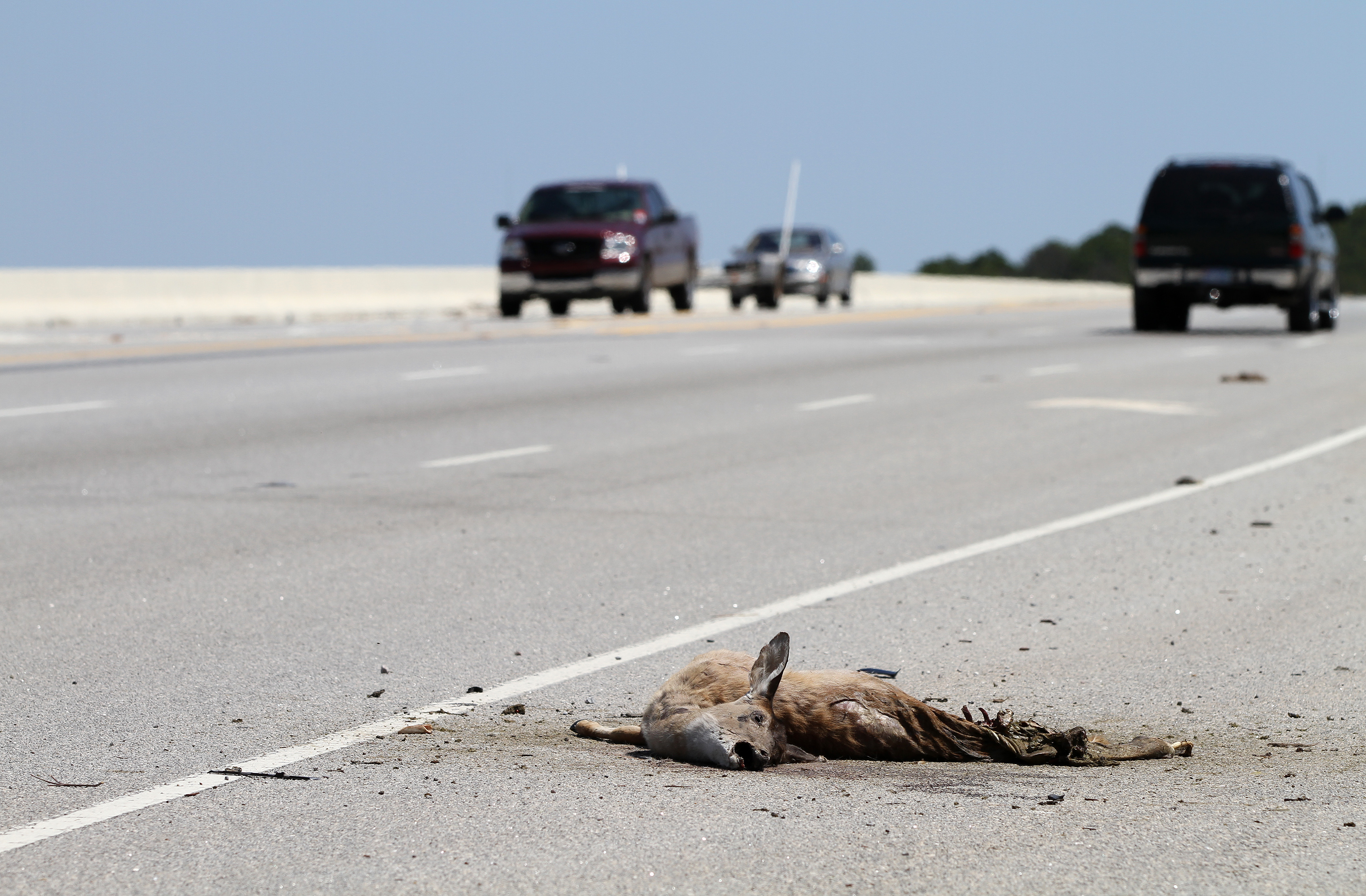
Roadkilled white-tailed deer on South Carolina Highway 170

A wildlife–vehicle collision is a traffic collision with an animal; if the animal dies, its corpse is referred to as roadkill. Wildlife-vehicle collisions (WVC) have increasingly been the topic of academic research to understand the causes, and how they can be mitigated.

== History ==
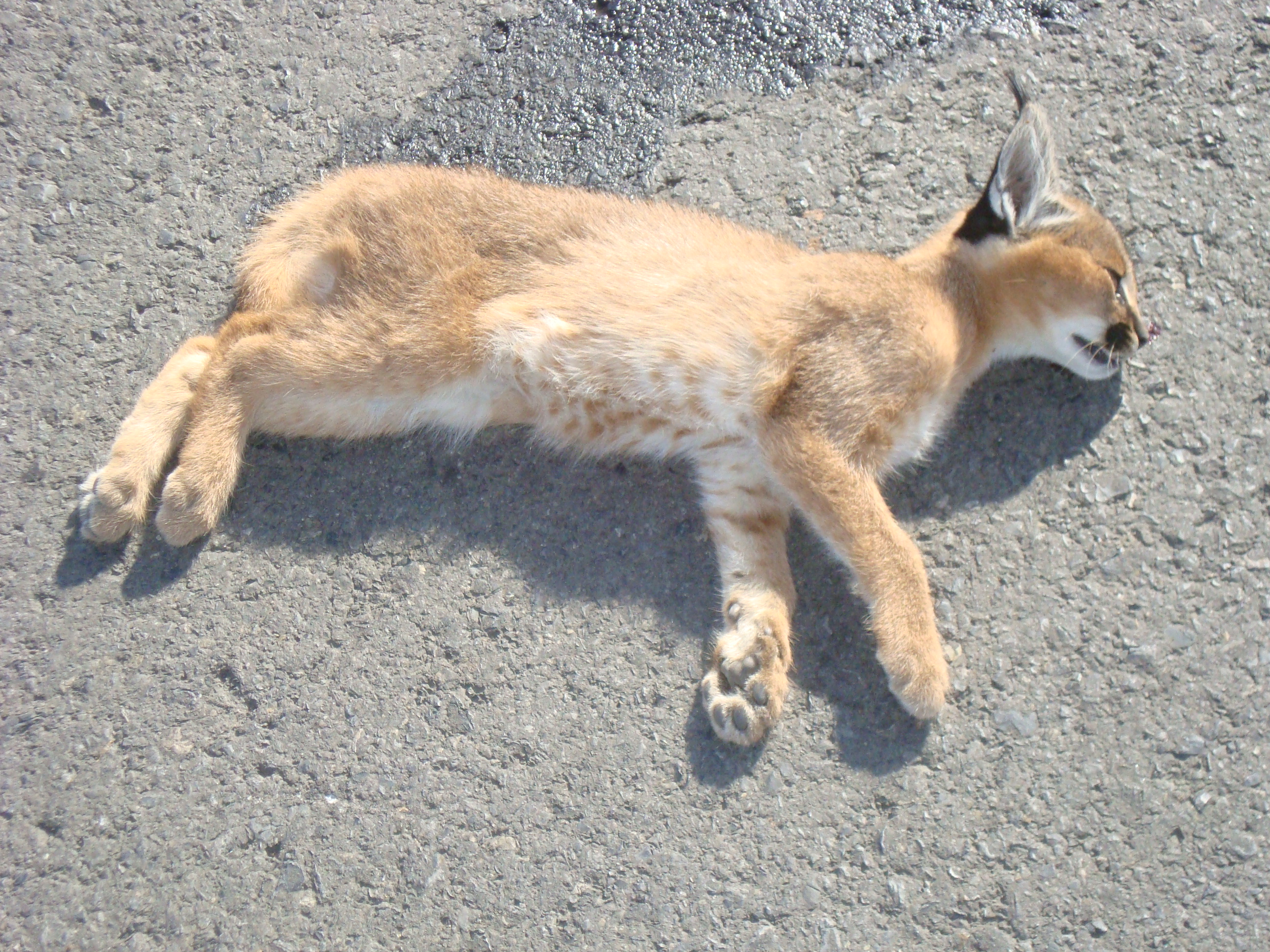
Roadkilled caracal in Afedena (exclosure), Ethiopia

Essentially non-existent before the advent of mechanized transport, roadkill is associated with increasing automobile speed in the early 20th century. In 1920, naturalist Joseph Grinnell wrote of his observations in the state of California that "this is a relatively new source of fatality; and if one were to estimate the entire mileage of such roads in the state, the mortality must mount into the hundreds and perhaps thousands every 24 hours."

In Europe and North America, deer are the animal most likely to be killed by vehicles.

== Causes ==
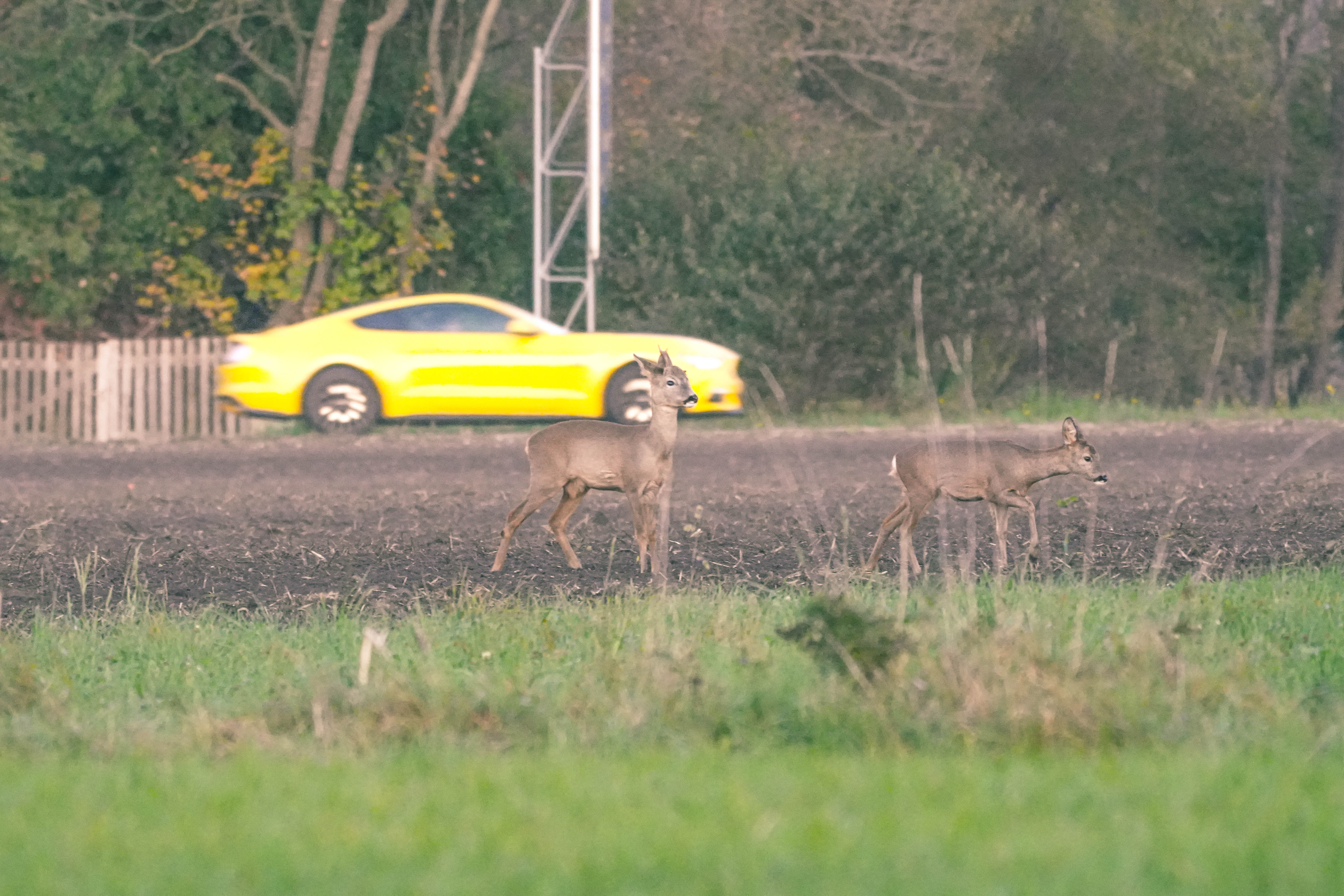
Deer that feed in close vicinity to a road are at risk of being killed in a road accident

The development of roads affects wildlife by altering and isolating habitat and populations, deterring the movement of wildlife, and resulting in extensive wildlife mortality. One writer states that "our insulated industrialized culture keeps us disconnected from life beyond our windshields." Driving "mindlessly" without paying attention to the movements of others in the vehicle's path, driving at speeds that do not allow stopping, and distractions contribute to the death toll. Moreover, a culture of indifference and hopelessness is created if people learn to ignore lifeless bodies on roads.

=== Intentional collisions ===
A study in Ontario, Canada in 1996 found many reptiles killed on portions of the road where vehicle tires do not usually pass over, which led to the inference that some drivers intentionally run over reptiles. To verify this hypothesis, research in 2007 found that 2.7% of drivers intentionally hit reptile decoys masquerading as snakes and turtles. Several drivers were seen to speed up when aiming for the decoys. Male drivers hit the reptile decoys more often than female drivers. However, 3.4% of male drivers and 3% of female drivers stopped to rescue the reptile decoys.

=== Road salt accumulations ===
On roadways where rumble strips are installed to provide a tactile vibration alerting drivers when drifting from their lane, the rumble strips may accumulate road salt in regions where it is used. The excess salt can accumulate and attract both small and large wildlife in search of salt licks; these animals are at great risk of becoming roadkill or causing accidents.

== Distribution and abundance ==
Very large numbers of mammals, birds, reptiles, amphibians and invertebrates are killed on the world's roads every day. A Humane Society volunteer survey conducted over three Memorial Day weekends in the 1960s estimated that one million vertebrate animals are killed by vehicular traffic daily in the United States. A 2008 Federal Highway Administration report estimates that 1 to 2 million accidents occur each year between large animals and vehicles. Extrapolating globally based on total length of roads, roughly 5.5 million vertebrates are killed per day, or over 2 billion annually.

The estimated number of birds killed on the roads in different European countries ranges from 350,000 to 27 million, depending on the factors such as the geography of the country and bird migration paths.

== Species affected ==
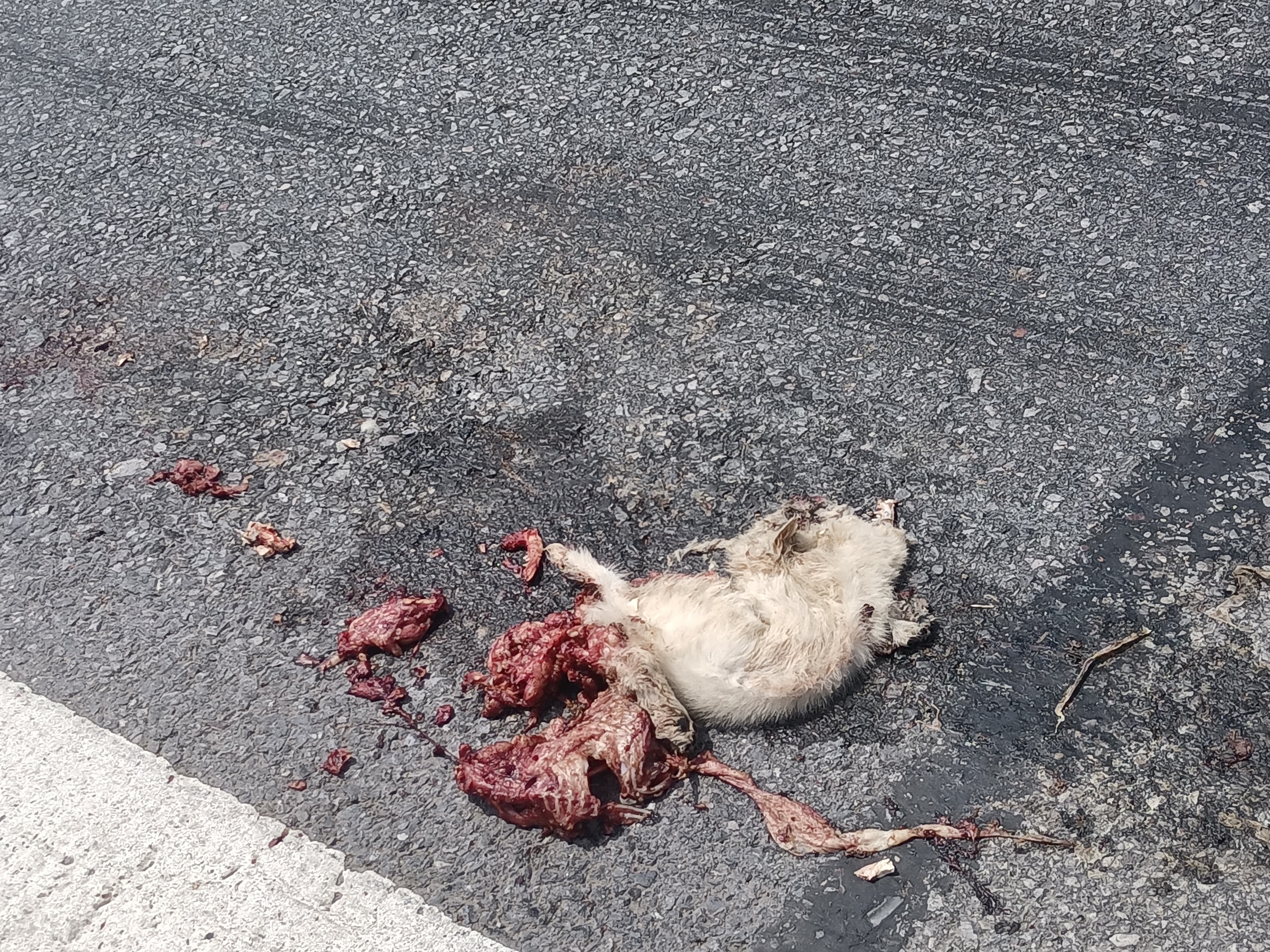
The corpse of a cat that was crushed due to a traffic accident

Mortality resulting from roadkill can be very significant for species with small populations. Roadkill is estimated to be responsible for 50% of deaths of Florida panthers, and is the largest cause of badger deaths in England. Roadkill is considered to significantly contribute to the population decline of many threatened species, including wolves, koalas and eastern quolls. In Tasmania, Australia the most common species affected by roadkill are brushtail possums and Tasmanian pademelons. In Bolivia there has been a report of an Andean cat, a critically endangered species, dead by a car collision.

In 1993, 25 schools throughout New England, United States, participated in a roadkill study involving 1,923 animal deaths. By category, the fatalities were: 81% mammals, 15% bird, 3% reptiles and amphibians, 1% indiscernible. Extrapolating these data nationwide, Merritt Clifton (editor of Animal People Newspaper) estimated that the following animals are being killed by motor vehicles in the United States annually: 41 million squirrels, 26 million cats, 22 million rats, 19 million Virginia opossums, 15 million raccoons, 6 million dogs, and 350,000 deer. This study may not have considered differences in observability between taxa (e.g. dead raccoons are easier to see than dead frogs), and has not been published in peer-reviewed scientific literature. Observability, amongst other factors, may be the reason for mammal species dominating roadkill reports, whereas bird and amphibian mortality are likely underestimated.

A 2-year study in northern India in an agricultural landscape covering 20 km of road identified 133 road kills of 33 species comprising amphibians, reptiles, birds and mammals. The study compared road-killed animals with all species seen along the road and estimated that traffic killed individuals of 30% of amphibian species, 25% of reptile species, 16% of birds, and 27% of mammals that were seen in the area.

=== Insects ===
A 2007 study showed that insects, too, are prone to a very high risk of roadkill incidence. Research showed interesting patterns in insect roadkills in relation to the vehicle density.

The decrease in insects being killed by cars is known as the "windshield phenomenon". In 2003–2004, the Royal Society for the Protection of Birds investigated anecdotal reports of declining insect populations in the UK by asking drivers to affix a postcard-sized PVC rectangle, called a "splatometer", to the front of their cars. Almost 40,000 drivers took part, and the results found one squashed insect for every 5 miles (8.0 km) driven. This contrasts with 30 years ago when cars were covered more completely with insects, supporting the idea that insect numbers had waned.

In 2011, Dutch biologist Arnold van Vliet coordinated a similar study of insect deaths on car license plates. He found two insects killed on the license-plate area for every 10 kilometres (6.2 mi) driven. This implies about 1.6 trillion insect deaths by cars per year in the Netherlands, and about 32.5 trillion deaths in the United States if the figures are extrapolated there. The number grows to 228 trillion per year if extended globally.

=== Scavengers ===
One rarely considered positive aspect of roadkill is the regular availability of carrion it provides for scavenger species such as vultures, crows, ravens, foxes, opossums and a wide variety of carnivorous insects. Areas with robust scavenger populations tend to see roadkilled animal corpses being quickly carried off, sometimes within minutes of being struck. This can skew data and cause a lower estimation of the number of roadkill animals per year. In particularly roadkill-prone areas, scavenging birds rely on roadkill for much of their daily nutritional requirements, and can even be seen observing the roadway from telephone poles, overhead wires and trees, waiting for animals, usually squirrels, opossums and raccoons to be struck so they can swoop down and feed. However, such scavengers are at greater risk of becoming roadkill themselves, and are subject to evolutionary pressure to be alert to traffic hazards.

In contrast, areas where scavengers have been driven out (such as many urban areas) often see roadkill rotting in place indefinitely on the roadways and being further macerated by traffic. The remains must be manually removed by dedicated disposal personnel and disposed of via cremation; this greatly increases the public nuisance inherent to roadkill, unnecessarily complicates its disposal, and consumes additional public money, time and fuel that could be spent on other roadway maintenance projects.

== Research ==
=== Roadkill observation projects ===
The study of roadkill has proven highly amenable to the application of citizen science observation methods. Since 2009, statewide roadkill observation systems have been started in the US, enrolling hundreds of observers in reporting roadkill on a website. The observers, who are usually naturalists or professional scientists, provide identification, location, and other information about the observations. The data are then displayed on a website for easy visualization and made available for studies of proximate causes of roadkill, actual wildlife distributions, wildlife movement, and other studies. Roadkill observation system websites are available for the US states of California, Maine, and Idaho. In each case, index roads are used to help quantify total impact of vehicle collisions on specific vertebrate taxa. Researchers that use data from citizen science platforms may benefit from a large pool of data, specially for iconic, well known conspicuous species. Care must be taken when analyzing data for species that are not easy to identify, as studies have shown that misidentification is not uncommon amongst these platforms.

In the United Kingdom, "The Road Lab" (formerly Project Splatter) was started by Cardiff University in 2012, with the aim of estimating the impact of roads and motoring on British wildlife. Since then it has gathered data on its website, and on several social media platforms including Facebook and Twitter.

In India, the project "Provide Animals Safe Transit on Highways" (PATH) was initiated by the Environment Conservation Group in 2015, to study the impact of roads on Indian wildlife. A team of five wildlife conservationists led by R. Mohammed Saleem had undertaken a forty-four-day expedition, traveling more than 17,000 kilometers across 22 states to study and spread awareness on roadkill. It is also gathering data on its website, and social media platforms. More focused scientific studies on impacts of traffic on animals have been conducted across India especially in the Western Ghats of south India documenting a large number of species of insects, other arthropods, amphibians, reptiles, birds and mammals killed. Another study conducted on 420 km of roads located along cultivated fields in Punjab showed granivorous birds to be killed far more than their availability, likely attracted to spilled grain on the roads.

In the Czech Republic, an online animal-vehicle crash reporting system Srazenazver.cz is gathering both professional (Police, road maintenance) and volunteered data on roadkill and wildlife-vehicle crashes. The application allows users to input, edit and browse data. The data is visualized in the form of maps, graphs or tables and analyzed online (KDE+ hotspots identification, area statistics).

In Australia, wombat roadkill data is collected by the citizen science project, WomSAT.

=== State wildlife roadkill identification guide ===
The first wildlife roadkill identification guide produced by a state agency in North America was published by the British Columbia Ministry of Transportation (BCMoT) in Canada in 2008. BCMoT's "Wildlife Roadkill Identification Guide" focused on the most common large carnivores and ungulates found in British Columbia. The guide was developed to assist BCMoT's maintenance contractors in identifying wildlife carcasses found on provincial highways as part of their responsibilities for BCMoT's Wildlife Accident Reporting System (WARS).

== Prevention ==
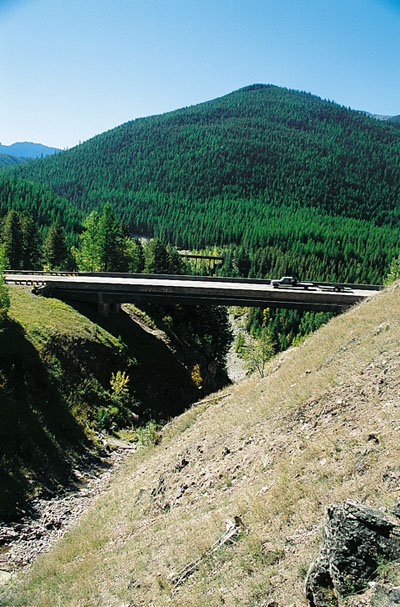
Mountain goats used to cross US Route 2 to reach a salt lick on the other side of the canyon. Now they can get there via rocky passageways underneath these bridges, shielded from view by tree cover and the steep hillside.

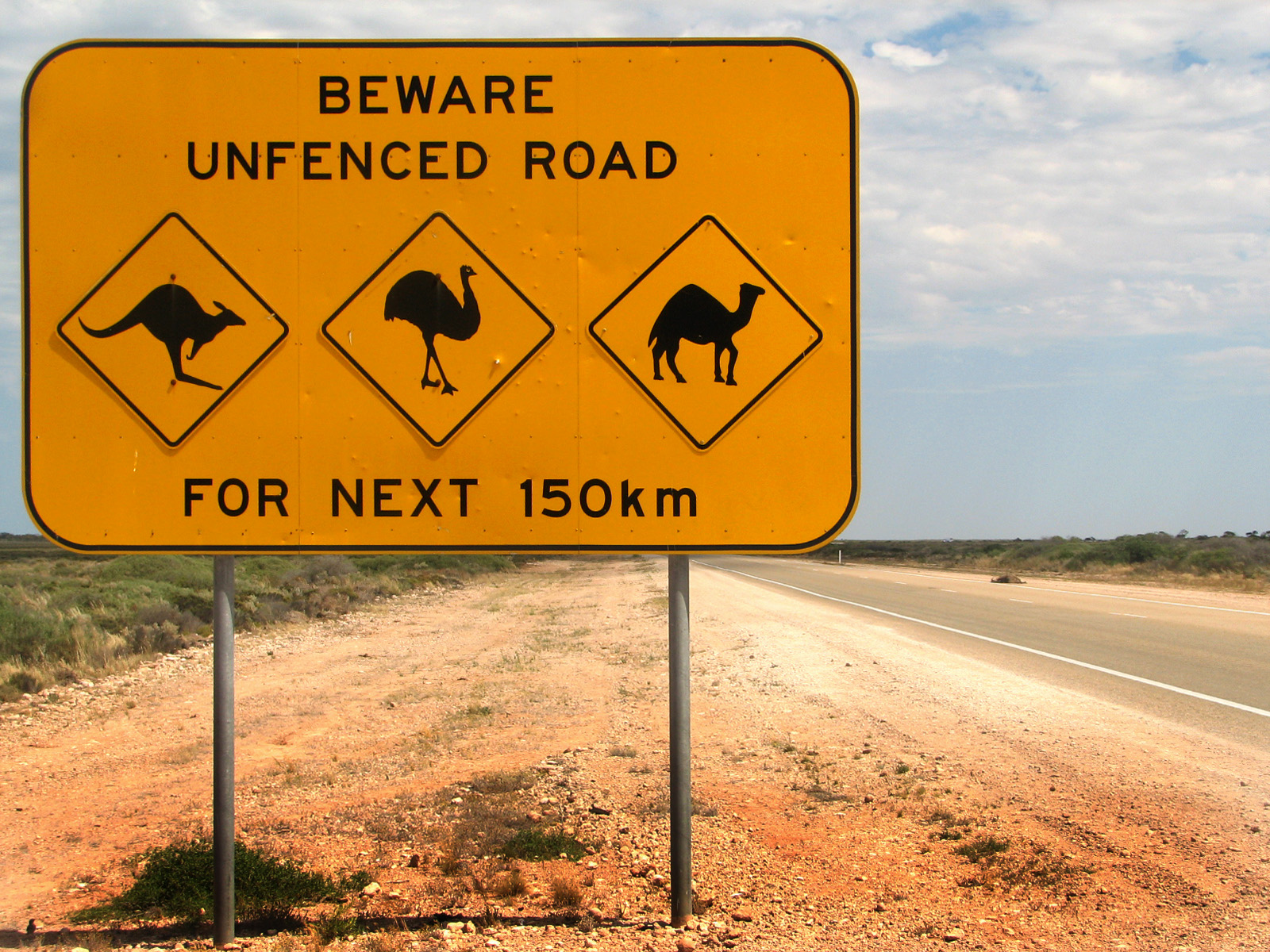
Traffic signs are often used to warn of areas with increased animal activity. These signs are not always successful, as shown by the dead emu in the far distance to the right of the sign.

Collisions with animals can have many negative consequences:

- Death and suffering of animals struck by vehicles
- Injury to, or death of, vehicle occupants
- Harm to endangered species
- Loss of livestock or pets
- Vehicle damage
- Economic losses (cleanup, repairs to vehicles, etc.)
- Being a distasteful sight, particularly costly to locations economically reliant on tourism

Regardless of the spatial scale at which the mitigation measure is applied, there are two main types of roadkill mitigation measures: changing driver behavior, and changing wildlife behavior.

There are three potential ways to change driver behavior. Primary methods focus on changing driver attitude by increasing public awareness and helping people understand that reducing roadkill will benefit their community. The second potential way is to make people aware of specific hazardous areas by use of signage, rumble strips or lighting. The third potential way is to slow traffic physically or psychologically, using chicanes or speed bumps.

There are three categories of altering wildlife behavior. Primary methods discourage wildlife from loitering on roadsides by reducing food and water resources, or by making the road surfaces lighter in color which may make wildlife feel more exposed on the roadway. Second are methods of discouraging wildlife from crossing roads, at least when cars are present, using equipment such as ultrasonic whistles, reflectors, and fencing. Third are mechanisms to provide safe crossing like overpasses, underpasses and escape routes.

Although it is not illegal to help wild animals that are in danger of becoming roadkill, stopping on the highway is potentially dangerous and may result in injury or death of the person that is helping them and/or an inattentive driver that collides into their stopped vehicle.

=== Large animals ===
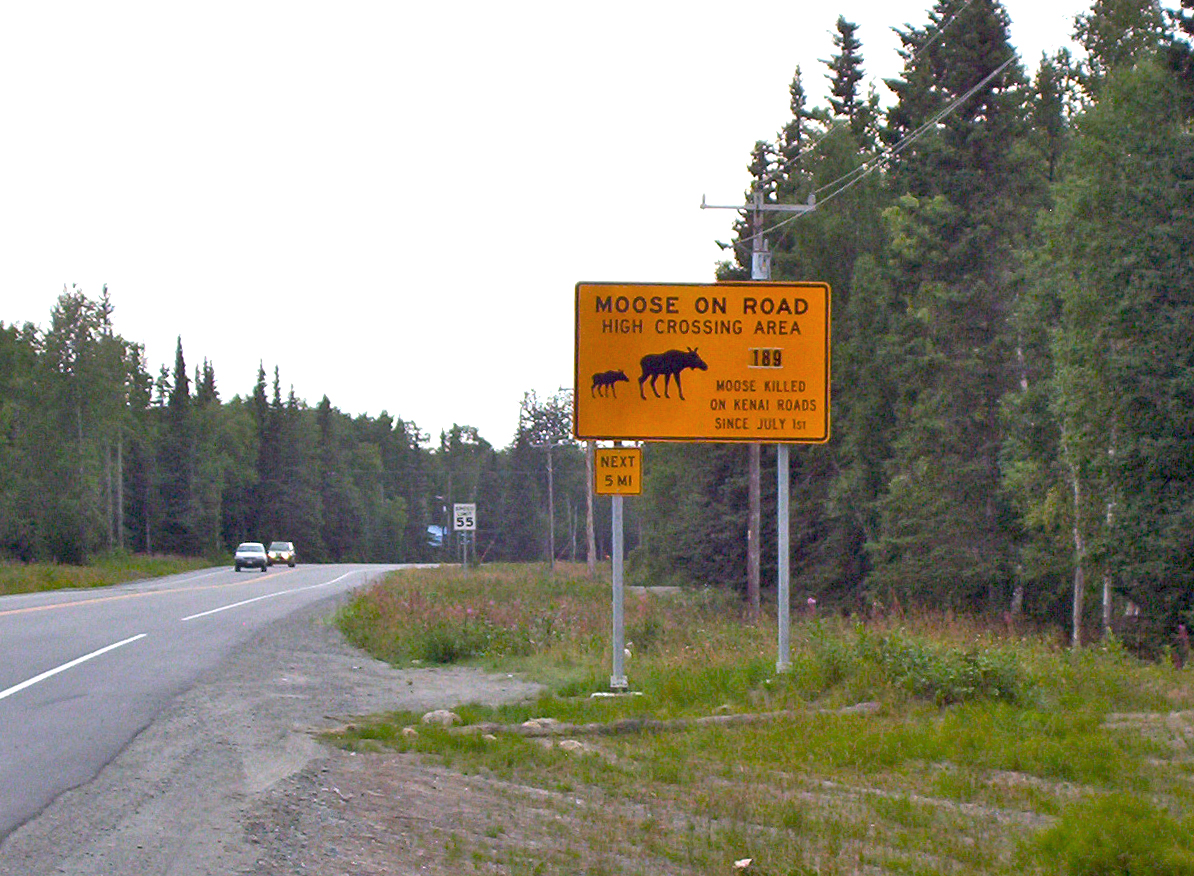
Moose crossing sign with kill counter, Kenai, Alaska. Trees and brush near the road are trimmed back to make approaching moose easier to see.

In the US, an estimated 1.25 million insurance claims are filed annually due to collisions with deer, elk, or moose, amounting to 1 out of 169 collision damage claims.

Collisions with large animals with antlers (such as deer) are particularly dangerous, but any large, long-legged animal (e.g. horses, larger cattle, camels) can pose a similar cabin incursion hazard. Injury to humans due to driver failure to maintain control of a vehicle either while avoiding, or during and immediately after an animal impact, is also common. Dusk and dawn are times of highest collision risk.

The recommended reaction to a large animal (such as a moose) is to slow down in lane, if at all possible, and to avoid swerving suddenly, which could cause loss of control. If a collision cannot be avoided, it is best to swerve towards the rear end of the animal, as it is more likely to run forward. Drivers who see a deer near or in the roadway should be aware that it is very likely that other members of a herd are nearby.

Acoustic warning deer horns can be mounted on vehicles to warn deer of approaching automobiles, though their effectiveness is disputed. Ultrasonic wind-driven whistles are often promoted as a cheap, simple way to reduce the chance of wildlife-vehicle collisions. In one study, the sound pressure level of the whistle was 3 dB above the sound pressure level of the test vehicle, but caused no observable difference in behavior of animals when the whistles were activated and not activated, casting doubt on their effectiveness.

In Australia, kangaroos are the most common species hit and killed by vehicles, causing significant damage and even fatalities. Another large species hit and killed by vehicles are wombats. Sightings of wombat roadkill can be logged at WomSAT to help support the implementation of mitigation strategies to reduce wombat deaths.

=== Small animals ===
Squirrels, rabbits, birds, or other small animals are often crushed by vehicles. Serious accidents may result from motorists swerving or stopping for squirrels in the road. Such evasive maneuvers are often unproductive, since small rodents and birds are much more agile and quicker to react than motorists in heavy vehicles. There is very little a driver can do to avoid an unpredictably darting squirrel or rabbit, or even to intentionally hit one. The suggested course of action is to continue driving in a predictable, safe manner, and let the small animal decide on the spur of the moment which way to run or fly; the majority of vehicular encounters end with no harm to either party.

=== Night driving ===
Although strikes can happen at any time of day, deer tend to move at dusk and dawn, and are particularly active during the October–December mating season as well as late March and early April in the Northern Hemisphere. Driving at night presents its own challenges: nocturnal species are active, and visibility, particularly side visibility, is reduced. Penguins, for example, are common roadkill traffic victims in Wellington, New Zealand due to their color and the fact that they come ashore at dusk and leave again around dawn.

Night time drivers should reduce speed and use high beam headlights when possible to give themselves maximum time to avoid a collision. However, when headlights approach a nocturnal animal, it is hard for the creature to see the approaching car (nocturnal animals see better in low than in bright light). Furthermore, the glare of oncoming vehicle headlights can dazzle some species, such as rabbits; they will freeze in the road rather than flee. It may be better to flash the headlights on and off, rather than leaving them on continuously while approaching an animal.

The simple tactics of reducing speed and scanning both sides of the road for foraging deer can improve driver safety at night, and drivers may see the retro-reflection of an animal's eyes before seeing the animal itself.

=== Wildlife crossings ===
Wildlife crossings allow animals to travel over or underneath roads. They are most widely used in Europe, but have also been installed in a few US locations and in parts of Western Canada. As new highways cause habitats to become increasingly fragmented, these crossings can play an important role in protecting endangered species.

In the US, sections of road known to have heavy deer cross-traffic will usually have warning signs depicting a bounding deer; similar signs exist for moose, elk, and other species. In the American West, roads may pass through large areas designated as "open range", meaning no fences separate drivers from large animals such as cattle or bison. A driver may round a bend to find a small herd standing in the road. Open range areas are generally marked with signage and protected by cattle grids.

In an attempt to mitigate US$1.2 billion in animal-related vehicular damage, a few US states now have sophisticated systems to protect motorists from large animals. One of these systems is called the Roadway Animal Detection System (RADS). A solar powered sensor can detect large animals such as deer, bear, elk, and moose near the roadway, and thereafter flash a light to alert oncoming drivers. The sensor's detection distance ranges from 650 feet (200 m) to unlimited, depending on the terrain.

=== Wildlife virtual fencing ===
Wildlife virtual fencing is a roadside wildlife protection technology that is intended to reduce wildlife–vehicle collisions by deterring animals from entering roads as vehicles approach. Unlike conventional fencing, these systems do not rely on physical barriers to block animal movement, and instead emit sounds and lights that are activated by approaching vehicle headlights to discourage wildlife from entering the roadway. Due to the system's reliance on vehicle headlights, it is generally operable between dusk and dawn.

=== Canopy crossings ===
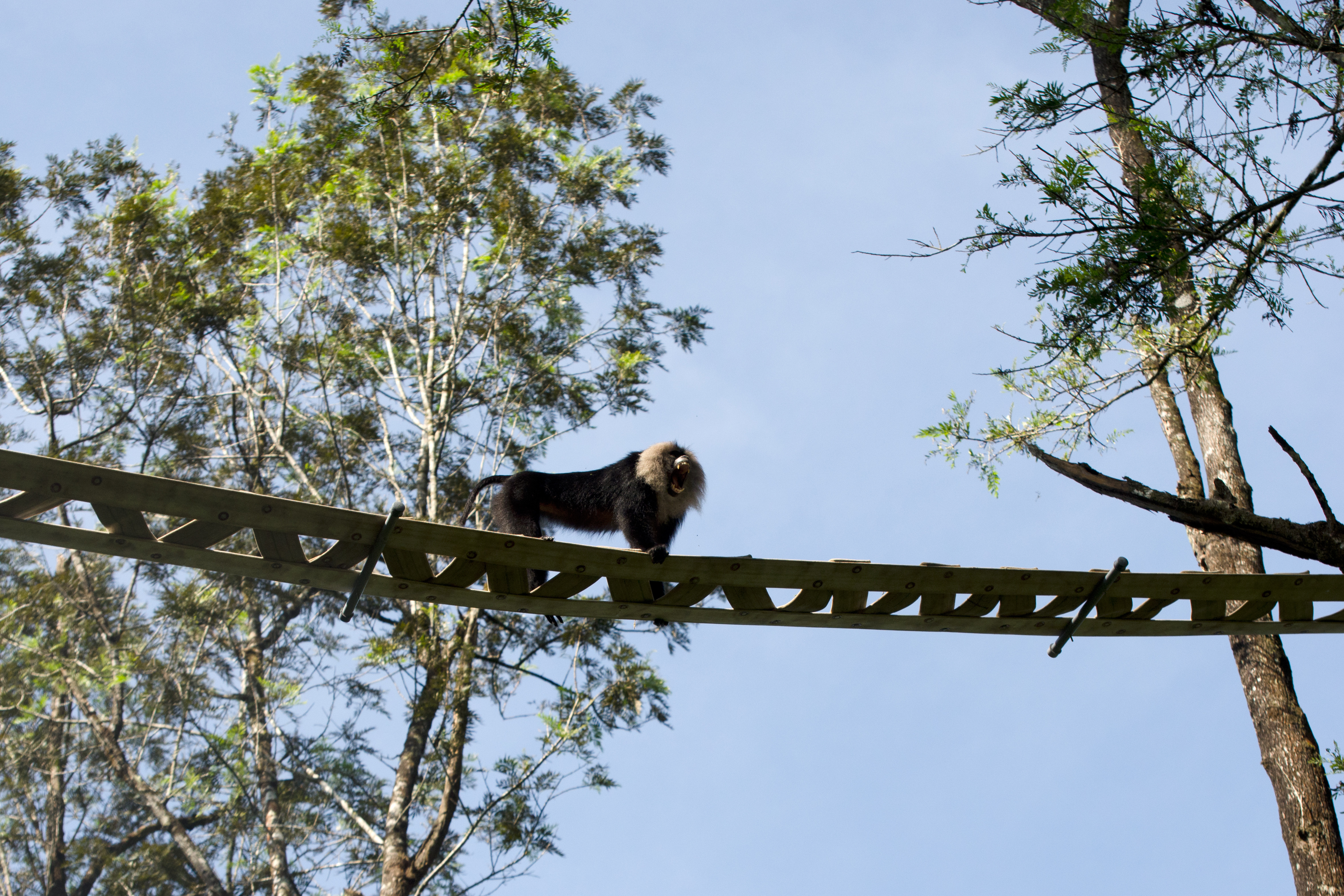
Lion-tailed macaque (Macaca silenus) on the canopy bridge in Anamalai Hills

The removal of trees associated with road construction produces a gap in the forest canopy that forces arboreal (tree dwelling) species to come to the ground to travel across the gap. Canopy crossings have been constructed for red squirrels in Great Britain, colobus monkeys in Kenya, and ringtail possums in Far North Queensland, Australia. The crossings have two purposes: to ensure that roads do not restrict movement of animals and also to reduce roadkill. Installation of the canopy crossings may be relatively quick and cheap.

=== Escape routes ===
Banks, cuttings and fences that trap animals on the road are associated with roadkill. In order to increase the likelihood of escape from a main roadway, escape routes have been constructed on the access roads. Escape routes may be considered as one of the most useful measures, especially when new roads are being built or roads are being upgraded, widened or sealed. Research may be undertaken into the efficacy of escape routes by observation of animals' response to vehicles in places with natural escape routes and barriers, rather than trialing purpose-built escape routes.

=== Fencing ===
In the New Forest, in southern England, there is a proposal to fence roads to protect the New Forest pony. However, this proposal is controversial.

=== Self-driving cars ===
Self-driving cars have been proposed as a solution to roadkill. As of January 15, 2026, the National Highway Traffic Safety Administration has recorded 22 collisions between self-driving cars and animals.

== Disposal ==
Removing animal carcasses from roadways is considered essential to public safety. The removal takes away the potential distraction and hazard of the carcass to other motorists. Quick removal can also prevent deaths of other animals that may wish to feed on the carcass, as well as animals that may go into the road to try to move the body of an animal in their social group. Sometimes rather than removal, the carcass is moved to a nearby public right-of-way where it can be consumed by scavengers, but not placed in a ditch or where waterways might be polluted. Covering the carcass with wood chips can aid in decomposition while minimizing odor.

Local governments and other levels of government have services that pick up dead animals from roadways, who will respond when advised about a dead animal.

New York City has an online request form which may be completed by residents of the city. New York State has a process to report dead wildlife to the Department of Environmental Conservation; they are especially interested in marked/tagged wildlife and endangered or threatened species.

In Toronto, Canada, the city accepts requests to remove a dead animal by telephone. If an animal is found along a major highway, depending on who has jurisdiction for maintaining the highway, the request may be directed to the city, the provincial Ministry of Transportation, or a highway operations centre. In Ontario, citizens may keep possession of roadkill in many circumstances, but may have to register their find.

== Eating roadkill ==
If fresh enough, roadkill can be eaten, and there are several recipe books dedicated to roadkill. The practice of eating animals killed on the road is usually derided, and most people consider it not to be safe, sanitary, or wholesome. For example, when the Tennessee legislature attempted to legalize the use of accidentally killed animals, they became the subject of stereotyping and derisive humor. Nevertheless, in some cultures there is tradition of using fresh roadkill as a nutritious and economical source of meat similar to that obtained by hunting.

In Central Oregon, a law was passed in 2019 allowing the salvage of deer and elk with a permit. Citizens with permits can scout for roadkill of these animals and share their findings with others in their group. Once an animal is found, they clean up the body from the road and take it home. The head is sent to the Oregon Department of Fish and Wildlife for testing, and once the report confirms the meat is safe, the body can be prepared for consumption. Some people even replace all store-bought red meat with venison, viewing it as a more natural alternative to commercially raised meat.

== Cultural references ==
=== Music ===
Songwriter and performer Loudon Wainwright III released his deadpan humorous song, "Dead Skunk (in the Middle of the Road)" in 1972, and it peaked at number 16 on the Billboard Hot 100.

The American band Phish frequently plays the song "Possum", originally from the album The Man Who Stepped into Yesterday at its concerts. The song describes an encounter with a roadkilled opossum and includes the lyric "Your end is the road".

The Horse Flies, an American alt rock/folk band from Ithaca, NY, released an upbeat homage to vehicularly-mediated food security titled "Roadkil" on their 1991 album, "Gravity Dance" exhorting the listener to "Eat what you kill".

=== Art ===
Roadkill is sometimes used as an art form. Several artists use traditional taxidermy preparation in their works whilst others explore different artforms. International artist Claudia Terstappen photographs roadkill and produces enormous prints which see the animals floating eerily in a void. American artist Gary Michael Keyes photographs and transforms them into "RoadKill Totems" in his "Resurrection Gallery". American artist Stephen Paternite has been exhibiting roadkill pieces since the 1970s.

=== Literature ===
Canadian writer Timothy Findley wrote about the experience of seeing killed animals on highways during travels: "The dead by the road, or on it, testify to the presence of man. Their little gestures of pain—paws, wings and tails—are the saddest, the loneliest, most forlorn postures of the dead I can imagine. When we have stopped killing animals as though they were so much refuse, we will stop killing one another. But the highways show our indifference to death, so long as it is someone else's. It is an attitude of the human mind I do not grasp."

=== Anthropology ===
In a 2013 essay, American anthropologist Jane Desmond examined at length the failure of American culture and public discourse to adequately confront the ubiquity of roadkill. She concluded: "The simplest answer is that these animal lives have little value for most of the populations in the United States, as these animals are unowned, lacking in monetary or emotional value, not pets or livestock, and without the charismatic following that megafauna like elephants and lions in zoos receive. This calculus of devaluation clears the way for such carnage to be ignored in public discourse and legal venues, to be out of mind while insistently in sight."

=== Video games ===
There are driving video games where players can run over animals, such as the arcade version of Cruis'n USA, as well as video games where players control an animal that crosses roads to avoid becoming roadkill, such as Frogger and Crossy Road.

=== Commercial branding ===
Some corporations have chosen to make light of animals killed by automobiles within their business identity. The Roadkill Cafe is a Route 66 roadside comfort food restaurant serving meals sourced from traditional agricultural producers. The Austin FC professional MLS soccer team has appointed as its unofficial mascot a nine-banded armadillo named "Speed Bump".

== See also ==
- Bird strike
- Bushmeat
- Deer–vehicle collisions
- Estray
- Habitat conservation
- Habitat destruction
- Habitat fragmentation
- Linear infrastructure intrusions
- Moose test
- Motor vehicle fatality rate in U.S. by year
- Road ecology
- Tree squirrel as roadkill and traffic hazards
- Wildlife
- Wildlife corridor
