= Wildlife virtual fencing =

Roadside wildlife deterrent system using sound and light signals

Wildlife virtual fencing is a roadside wildlife protection technology that is intended to reduce wildlife–vehicle collisions by deterring animals from entering roads as vehicles approach. Unlike conventional fencing, these systems do not rely on physical barriers to block animal movement, and instead emit sounds and lights that are activated by approaching vehicle headlights to discourage wildlife from entering the roadway. Due to the system's reliance on vehicle headlights, it is generally operable between dusk and dawn.

== History ==
In the late 20th century, Austria was among the first countries to develop virtual fencing technology to deter wild deer, with the goal of reducing wildlife-vehicle collisions. After a five year trial in Austria had reported that it had lowered road kills by 80-90%, the technology was launched throughout Europe in 2003. However, the methodology and reporting of the early Austrian trial have been criticised by later researchers.

Australia later trialed wildlife virtual fencing in multiple road corridors, including at Long Beach, NSW, Sunshine Coast, QLD, and along the Great Ocean Road, VIC, with the aim to reduce wildlife-vehicle collisions that involves species such as kangaroos, Tasmanian devils, deer, koalas, and wombats.

Reported results have been mixed. An eight months trial at Eurobodalla Shire areas in 2023 reported a 90 per cent decrease in the number of kangaroo collisions with vehicles, however a three-year trial at Phillip Island, between 2019 and 2022, saw no significant difference.

According to a Victorian parliamentary inquiry report published on November 2025, global studies have indicated that sound and light signals may be effective where they take into account the "biological relevance" of the warning signal, and that behavioural studies on Australian animals are "presently lacking" to assess the effectiveness of the technology. The report noted that researchers in Sweden found that certain sounds like human voices were most effective in deterring wild Swedish deer, although effectiveness may vary depending on habituation to humans.

In 2025, over 1,300 residents in the Australian Capital Territory (ACT) signed a petition calling on the ACT Government to trial wildlife virtual fencing across Canberra to help reduce kangaroo roadkill incidents.

== See also ==
- Geofencing
- Wildlife conservation technology
