= Stag Hunt (Huang Zongdao) =

Song Dynasty painting depicting Deer Hunt

Stag Hunt (Deer Hunting Scroll)
- 獵鹿圖 卷 (Liè lù tú juǎn) (Chinese)
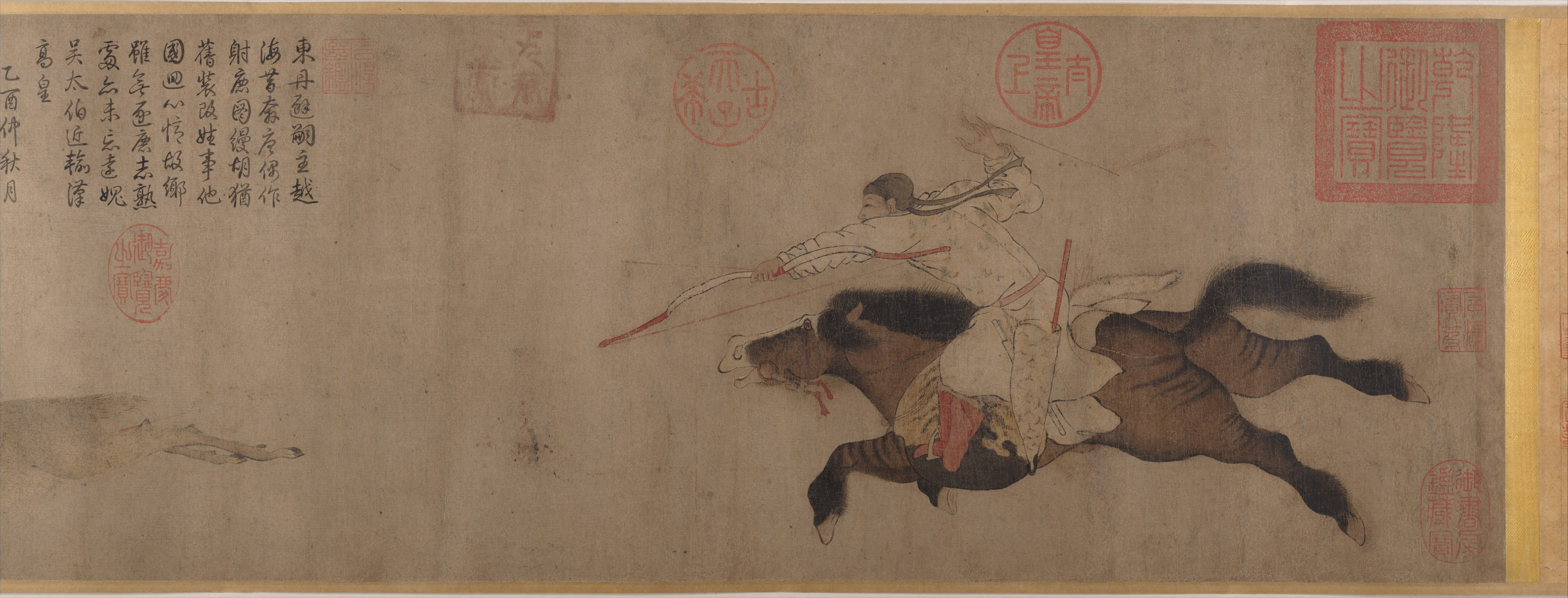
- Artist: attributed to Huang Zongdao
- Year: 1120
- Medium: silk handscroll
- Subject: Deer Hunting
- Dimensions: 25.7 cm × 689 cm (10.1 in × 271 in); Image (24.6 x 78.9 cm) Scroll (25.7 x 689 cm)
- Location: Metropolitan Museum of Art, New York City
- Accession: 1982.3.1
- Website: https://www.metmuseum.org/art/collection/search/39938

The Stag Hunt (Chinese: 獵鹿圖 卷; pinyin: liè lù tú juǎn), or Deer Hunting Scroll is a 12th-century Chinese scroll painting depicting an equestrian deer hunt by an aristocratic hunter. Originally attributed to Yelü Bei, also known as Li Zanhua, a former king of the Dongdan Kingdom who then defected to Emperor Mingzong of Later Tang during the turbulent Five Dynasties and Ten Kingdoms period by owners of the painting, the work is now attributed to the artist Huang Zongdao. Recognized by many famed artists throughout Chinese history like Zhu Derun, Shen Zhou, and the Qing Imperial Court, the scroll was acquired by the Metropolitan Museum of Art in 1982, where it has been ever since.

== Provenance ==
The Five Dynasties and Ten Kingdoms period, a result of the fall of Tang, saw regular incursions and conflict with the nomadic tribes of the north. Among the empires that gained prominence were the Khitans who gain controlled parts of China including what would be present day Beijing, under the rule of Abaoji. Yelü Bei, Abaoji's oldest son held the jurisdiction of the Dongdan Kingdom in present-day Manchuria. Bei received both Khitan and Chinese education during his youth and this would come useful in his defection to the Later Tang after Abaoji's death, a result a succession struggle with his younger brother, Yelü Deguang (Emperor Taizong of Liao). Bei would end up under the asylum of Li Siyuan and acquire the adopted name of Li Zanhua.

Considered a cultural mediator between the nomads and the established court, Li Zanhua's artistic reputation has been established through his depictions of horses and nomads, with recognition by artists Li Gonglin, who collected and copied his works, as well as Emperor Huizong who owned 15 of his paintings in the Song dynasty catalogue raisonné Xuanhe Huapu; which emphasized a nationalist tone of "civilizing the nomads"; two of these paintings involve the theme of hunting. The Xuanhe Huapu credits Li Zanhua as a founding father of fanzu (番族), or barbarian imagery. Other works emerging during this time period of the 10th century has shown the emergence of distinct styles of Liao influence blending into otherwise Chinese conventions.

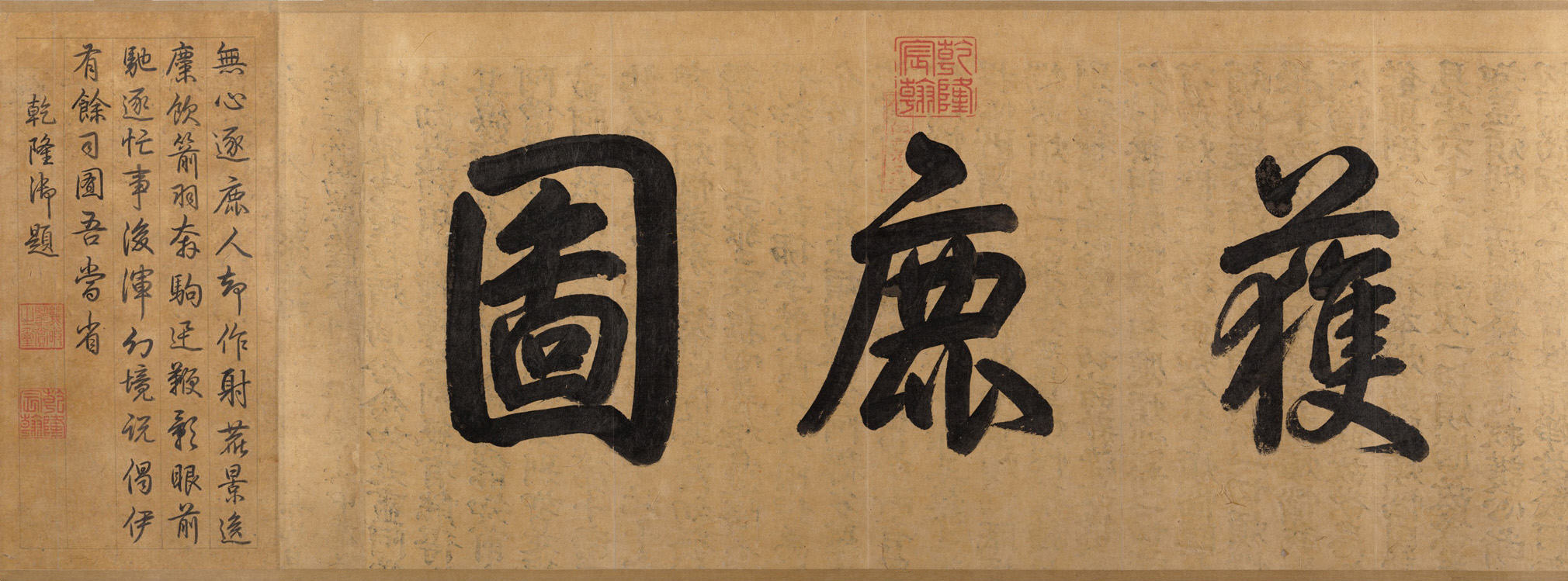
Frontispiece by the Qianlong Emperor (1765)

Stag Hunt, while it had the pictorial themes made famous by Li Zanhua, the painting style and interpretation, has leaned towards being a work made later in the Song Dynasty by Huang Zongdao, a member of the Northern Song Painting Service Bureau established by Huizong (next to Hanlin Academy).

The painting saw a long lineage of owners, with Zhu Derun inscribing a 10-column annotation on 27 January 1352, with the biography and attributes of Li Zanhua in praise of the work:

He liked to paint bow-carrying horsemen in hunting or excursions. Their clothing and accessories followed the rustic barbarian convention because that was what he was used to and comfortable with. His brushwork is smooth and fine, while the men and the horses appear dynamic, which truly captures the spirit of the High Tang period [8th century].

Other owners marked themselves throughout the centuries including the names of Song Guang (14th century), Ma Lin (14th century), Liu Yizheng (1401), Shen Zhou, Cao Shizhong, Ku Fu, and then the Qianlong Emperor who wrote on the margins in 1765:

Fleeing the throne of Dongdan, I crossed the sea to flee to Tang.

I casually painted 'Hunting Deer,' the Manchu attire still lingering.

Changing my surname to serve another country, my heart yearns for my homeland.

Though I have no ambition to conquer, I have not forgotten the familiar places.

I am far inferior to Wu Taibo, and recently,

I am inferior to Emperor Gaozu of Han. Re-inscribed in the mid-autumn month of the year Yiyou."

The painting passed thru the Qing Imperial Family, with the stamps of the Jiaqing Emperor and the Xuantong Emperor. It was then eventually acquired by Edward Elliott, to which the Metropolitan Museum of Art purchased the painting with funds from U.S. Secretary of the Treasury C. Douglas Dillon in 1982.

== Description ==
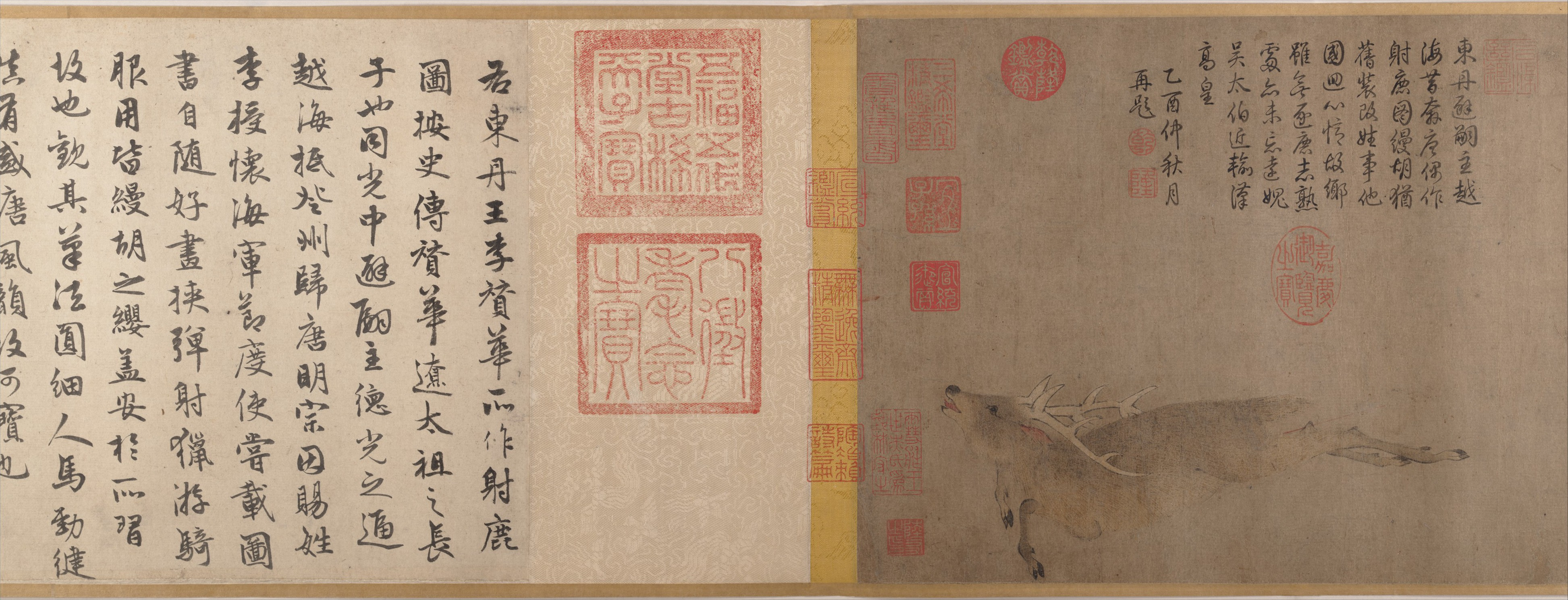
Wounded Deer

The image itself measures 24.6 by 78.9 cm, with the mounting and annotations of its past owners extending to 25.7 by 689 cm. The hunter is depicted as a young Khitan noble with his dark brown steed in full dynamic gallop while firing an arrow, with his right hand reaching for a second. On the opposite side, a wounded deer, rendered with soft fur and blurred to the background continues to attempt another leap though its body is almost crouched over. The hooves of the horse utilizes a treadmill effect to depict the speed and hunter closing in on the catch. Earlier depictions of this motif has been found in Han dynasty rubbings, which depict nomadic hunting by Scythians/Siberians from the steppe.

The interpretations by Song and Ming scholars interprets the horse and hunter as a domineering figure with bulging muscles, while the deer is seen as a gentle victim. Shen Zhou's annotation on the painting interprets it as an allegory of the violence by rulers on their subjects, with the hope that viewers will glean a pacifist moral off of the work.
