= Wildlife conservation technology =

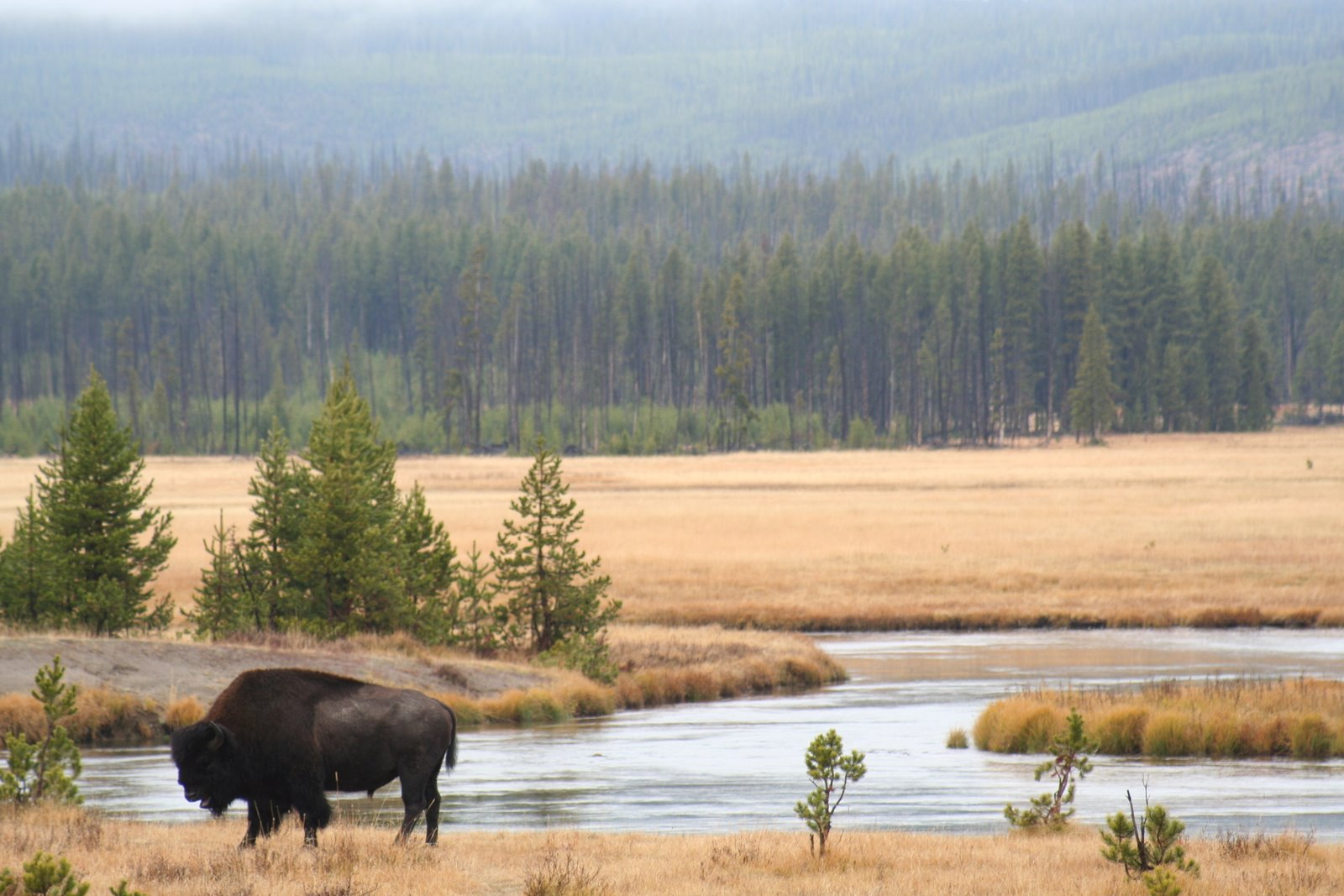
Bison in Yellowstone National Park

Technologies in wildlife conservation are technical tools and scientific systems used to support the protection, monitoring, and management of wild species and their habitats. These technologies are used to address species declines, habitat loss, conflicts between humans and wildlife, and unlawful exploitation of wildlife in both terrestrial and aquatic environments. Over time, advances in scientific equipment and data analysis have enabled conservation practitioners to gather information with higher accuracy and with less direct disturbance to animals than traditional methods.

A variety of modern tools are used in wildlife conservation, including remote sensing systems, devices that track animal movements, automated camera systems, drones or unmanned aerial vehicles (UAVs), methods that detect environmental DNA (eDNA), geographic information systems (GIS), and software platforms that process large datasets.

== History and development ==
Human efforts to observe and understand wildlife behaviour long pre‑date modern technologies, and early cases used physical marking techniques to learn about animal movement patterns, such as Bird Banding in the early 1800s. The use of technology in wildlife research and conservation increased significantly with the introduction of early tracking and telemetry equipment in the mid‑20th century. Since then, advances in telemetry have facilitated research in wildlife biology, ecology, physiology, and conservation. By the mid-1990s, GPS manufacturers began producing smaller, more energy efficient receiver engines, enabling wildlife tracking as these chips were integrated into specialized devices. In the early 2000s and 2010s, advancements in networked sensors and remote devices allowed technologies like camera traps, acoustic recorders, and satellites to be integrated, providing comprehensive monitoring of animal movements and habitats.

== Remote sensing and habitat monitoring ==
=== Camera traps ===
Camera traps are automated cameras used in wildlife ecology and conservation because they generate large amounts of data that can be used to estimate presence, occupancy, behaviour, and population trends. They operate using passive infrared sensors that detect heat and motion, automatically capturing photos or videos, which reduces the need for researchers to be physically present and limits disturbance. They are commonly used to monitor species that are difficult to observe directly, such as nocturnal, or elusive animals, and can remain in place for extended periods with minimal disturbance. Camera traps can produce thousands to millions of images, and researchers increasingly use machine learning and artificial intelligence to automate species identification, which can reduce manual processing time and improve accuracy when models are properly trained.

=== Drones and aerial monitoring ===
Unmanned Aerial Vehicles (UAVs), or commonly known as drones, are used to observe landscapes and wildlife from above. They allow researchers to cover broad areas much faster than on foot, gather high‑resolution imagery, and monitor habitats that are remote or difficult for ground surveys. UAVs can be fitted with high‑resolution cameras, thermal sensors, multispectral sensors, and even LiDAR systems that collect detailed environmental data. UAV surveys allow researchers to directly count animals in aerial images and estimate population densities using statistical models, providing data that can complement ground-based methods such as camera traps. Drones can also map vegetation and land cover to assess habitat conditions, tree health, fragmentation, and changes over time, supporting conservation planning and management.

== Artificial intelligence and machine learning ==
Artificial intelligence (AI) and machine learning (ML) can automate data processing in wildlife conservation and support detection and can classify tasks across large ecological datasets. AI and ML are efficient at managing imagery from camera traps, and drones, where manual analysis would be time intensive. They can also identify rare species that are overlooked during conventional surveys, which would enhance detection sensitivity and support conservation for threatened species. AI and ML can also flag unusual activities and any uncertain observations for researchers to validate, allowing for both more efficient monitoring and quality control.

=== AI in anti-poaching efforts ===
AI is increasingly applied to predict and prevent illegal activities, such as poaching, by analyzing spatial and temporal patterns in wildlife habitats, patrol routes, and historical incident records. With the help of predictive models, hotspots of elevated risks can be identified, which would enable conservation authorities to prioritize surveillance in those areas, as a proactive measure versus a reactive one. Adding to this, systems can also flag unusual movement or behaviour in wildlife populations that may indicate human disturbance or illegal activity.

== Genetic and eDNA technologies ==
Environmental DNA (eDNA) is a non-invasive method that detects genetic material shed by organisms into the environment, such as water, soil, snow, or air, to determine species presence without the need for direct observation or capture. In aquatic systems, eDNA analysis can be used to map species distributions, monitor biodiversity, and assess habitat conditions by identifying organisms including fish, zooplankton, benthic species, and microorganisms. By enabling detection of multiple species from single environmental samples, eDNA provides a complementary approach to conventional monitoring techniques and can inform biodiversity assessments, conservation planning, and habitat management at regional and global scales.

== Case studies ==
=== WildDrone Autonomous Monitoring Project (Kenya) ===
In Kenya, a project called WildDrone, led by researchers from the University of Southern Denmark, are using artificial intelligence (AI) to support wildlife conservation. WildDrone operates through collaborations with local institutions, including the Kenya Wildlife Service, Ol Pejeta Conservancy, and the Kenya Civil Aviation Authority, ensuring that the technology is adapted to local field needs. Rangers and scientists work together to test and refine algorithms and workflows. The project also places emphasis on capacity building, running workshops with Kenyatta University and conservation forums to train students and women in drone operation and AI applications, fostering future expertise in conservation technology.

WildDrone has tested new technologies such as solar-powered glider drones that can fly long distances and swarming drones that can monitor multiple animals at the same time. Artificial intelligence (AI) is used to help make decisions in real time, for example to detect animal behaviour or possible threats to wildlife, such as poaching.

The project emphasizes ethical use of technology, aiming to reduce errors and avoid disturbing animals. It also provides data that governments and conservation organizations can use to make informed decisions. WildDrone plans to expand its approach to other regions and continue developing new types of sensors, combining technology with local knowledge and community participation.

=== Pilot eDNA Metabarcoding Surveys on U.S. National Wildlife Refuges ===
In 2024–2025, the U.S. Fish and Wildlife Service conducted a pilot study to assess the effectiveness of environmental DNA (eDNA) metabarcoding for characterizing aquatic biodiversity across 13 National Wildlife Refuges in Oregon and Washington. The study aimed to evaluate the utility of eDNA methods for detecting a broad range of taxa in diverse aquatic habitats, including small streams, large rivers, and lakes, and to provide recommendations for future eDNA‑based monitoring efforts. Researchers collected water samples and analyzed genetic material using two genetic markers to identify species and operational taxonomic units (OTUs). Overall, fish represented the most frequently detected vertebrate group, with several species identified at specific refuges, and the results demonstrated that eDNA metabarcoding can reveal patterns of biodiversity across refuges, offering a promising complement to traditional survey techniques for monitoring wildlife and informing conservation planning.

=== Spyfish Aotearoa Automated Marine Protected Area Monitoring ===
Spyfish Aotearoa is a collaborative project developed by Wildlife.ai and Te Papa Atawhai, the New Zealand Department of Conservation (DOC) to apply artificial intelligence (AI) and citizen science to the monitoring of marine protected areas (MPAs) in Aotearoa New Zealand. DOC historically conducted underwater surveys in MPAs using baited underwater video (BUV) systems, which capture footage of fish communities at fixed locations and are manually reviewed by researchers to estimate species abundance and diversity. However, reviewing hundreds of hours of video footage is time‑consuming and resource intensive.

To address this challenge, the Spyfish Aotearoa initiative created a digital workflow that integrates standardized data collection apps, a central video database, machine learning models, and a user‑friendly dashboard for data visualization. AI models have been trained to recognize key species such as snapper (Pagrus auratus) and blue cod (Parapercis colias) in underwater footage, enabling automated analysis of video clips that would otherwise require manual annotation.

The project also incorporates citizen science: short video clips are uploaded to the Zooniverse platform, where volunteers help classify fish species. These volunteer annotations improve training datasets and allow the AI to learn from diverse examples. Low‑confidence cases flagged by the AI or community participants are reviewed by experts, concentrating expert effort on more difficult identifications.

By automating species detection and streamlining data processing, Spyfish Aotearoa aims to provide DOC with faster and more consistent evidence on fish populations and ecosystem health in marine reserves. This supports more efficient conservation planning and helps rangers focus on crucial fieldwork rather than extensive video review, contributing to broader efforts to monitor and protect marine biodiversity in New Zealand's protected waters.
