= Deer horn =

Vehicle-mounted wildlife warning device

A deer horn, or deer whistle, is a whistle mounted on automobiles intended to help prevent collisions with deer. Air moving through the device produces sound (ultrasound in some models), intended to warn deer of a vehicle's approach. Deer are highly unpredictable, skittish animals whose normal reaction to an unfamiliar sound is to stop, look and listen to determine if they are being threatened. If the whistle gives them advance warning, they may freeze on the roadside, rather than running across the road into the path of the vehicle.

In Australia, a different product, with electrically powered speakers (Shu Roo), is used to decrease collisions with kangaroos.

Researchers with the University of Wisconsin–Madison measured three devices and a press report said they found these three devices produced "low-pitched and ultrasonic sounds at speeds of 30 to 70 miles per hour; however, researchers were unable to verify that deer responded to the sounds."

Researchers with the Georgia Game and Fish Department have pointed out several reasons for ultrasound devices not to work as advertised:

- Some deer whistles do not emit any ultrasonic sound under the advertised operating conditions (typically when the vehicle exceeds 30 mph).
- Ultrasonic sound does not carry very well. It does not travel a long enough distance to provide adequate warning, and also is stopped by virtually any intervening object, so any curves in a road will block the sound.
- Little is known about the auditory limits of deer, but current knowledge indicates that deer hear approximately the same frequencies as humans, and thus if humans can't hear a sound, deer probably can't either.
- If deer could hear ultrasound, it is unknown if it would alarm them or induce a flight response.

In addition to the Georgia and Wisconsin studies, a status report in 1993 by the Insurance Institute for Highway Safety found the Ohio State Police did not experience a deer-vehicle collision reduction after installing deer whistles on their fleet of patrol vehicles.

The Department of Zoology at the University of Melbourne did independent testing, funded by the Royal Automobile Club of Victoria, New South Wales Road Traffic Authority, National Roads and Motorists’ Association Limited, and Transport South Australia. They bought one Shu Roo and tested it on a sedan, a 4x4, an 18-seat bus, and a cargo truck. The Shu Roo could be heard by their test equipment above the sound of wind and vehicle engines at up to 30 meters (98 ft). Wind on test days ranged from 0 to 57 kilometres per hour (35 mph). They also compared road collisions among fleet vehicles with and without Shu Roos, especially targeting bus and truck companies. They used pre-existing installations of Shu Roos at the participating companies, not random assignment. Vehicles averaged one collision with a kangaroo per 50,000 kilometres (31,000 mi), the same value with and without Shu Roos. They excluded two vehicles with Shu Roos which hit 39 and 25 kangaroos respectively, each in one night. The collisions of non-Shu Roo vehicles were concentrated in fewer vehicles than the collisions of Shu Roo vehicles, which may reflect routes or drivers. Fleet managers reported some Shu Roos did not stay on. It was hard to recruit professional drivers willing to report their mileage to the survey. An alternative in future studies would be to enlist a car hire company, since they already track mileage, could randomly assign devices to cars, and benefit from accurate results.
