= Houston Energy Corridor =

Energy Corridor
- Business district of Greater Houston
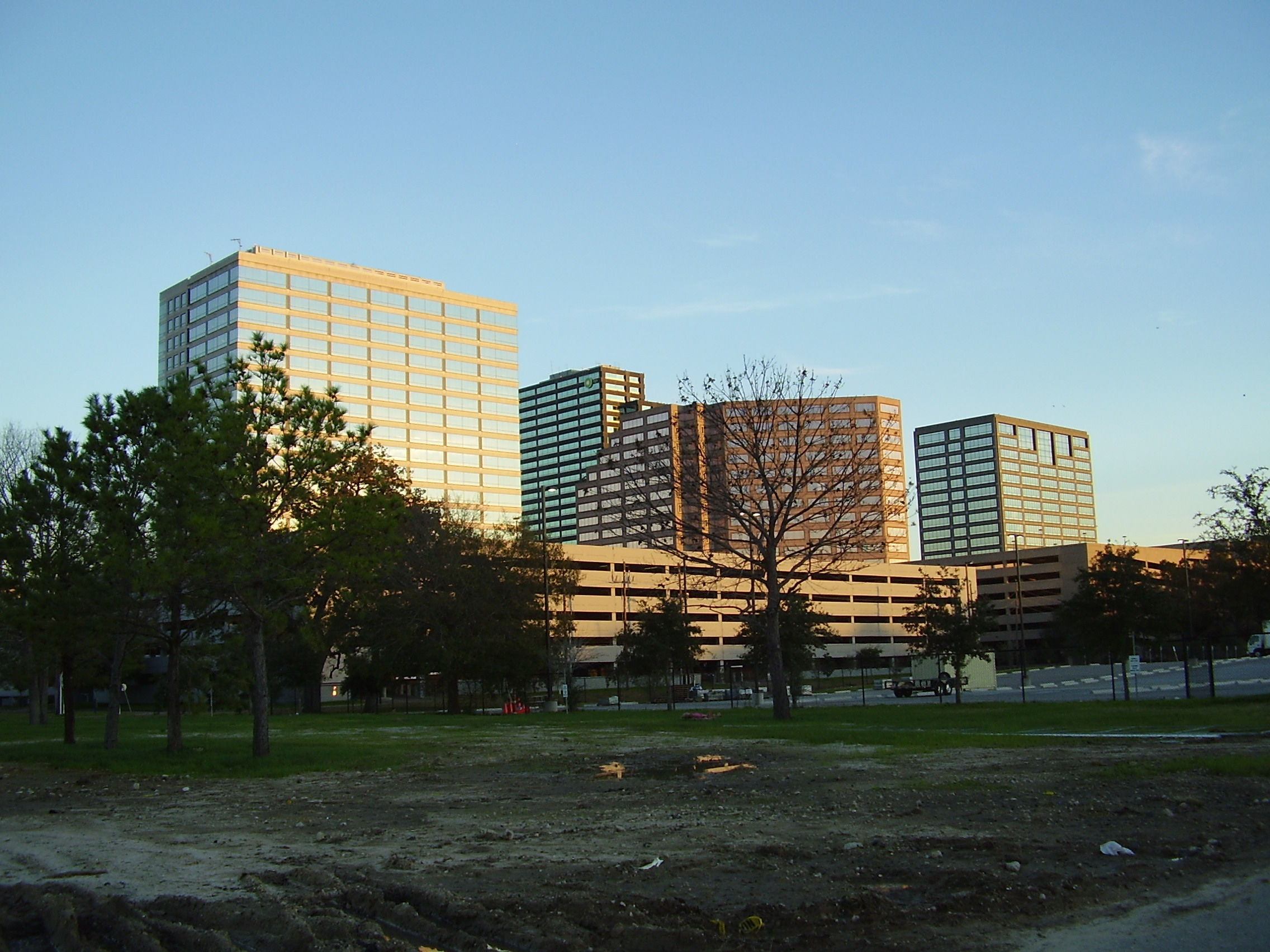
- Westlake Park, which contains the BP Americas headquarters
- Interactive map of Energy Corridor
- Coordinates: 29.77°N 95.63°W
- Country: United States
- State: Texas
- County: Harris

Government
  - Type: County Improvement District
  - Body: Harris County Improvement District #4 (Energy Corridor Management District)

Population
  - Estimate (2016): 22,034
- Website: energycorridor.org

The Energy Corridor is a business district in Houston, Texas, located on the west side of the metropolitan area between Beltway 8 and the Grand Parkway. The district straddles a 7-mile (11 km) stretch of Interstate 10 (the Katy Freeway) from Kirkwood Road westward to Barker Cypress Road and extends south along Eldridge Parkway to Briar Forest Drive. Parts of the district overlap with the Memorial area of Houston. The district is located north of Westchase, another major business district of Houston, and east of Greater Katy.

Many energy sector companies have major operations in the Energy Corridor, including BP America, Citgo, ConocoPhillips, Copper Tip Energy, Nouryon and Shell USA. Non-energy firms also have a presence; Sysco and Gulf States Toyota Distributors are both headquartered in the district. The Energy Corridor contains over 26 million square feet (2,400,000 m^{2}) of office space, with an employment capacity of over 105,000.

Over 26,000 acres (41 mi^{2}; 110 km^{2}) of urban park area borders the Energy Corridor, including George Bush Park and Bear Creek Pioneers Park. These parks are located within Barker Reservoir and Addicks Reservoir, respectively, which comprise a major flood control system for Buffalo Bayou.

== History ==
Energy industry corporations began moving to west Houston in the 1970s, seeking land for suburban office campuses and proximity to new housing developments.

Browning-Ferris Industries (BFI) had its headquarters in the district until its acquisition by Allied Waste in 2000.

In 2001, the Texas Legislature created the 1,700-acre (2.7 mi^{2}) Energy Corridor Management District. In Texas, management districts are special government entities empowered to levy commercial taxes within their boundaries to support investments in infrastructure, urban planning, district branding and advertising, and public safety. Since then, the district has been actively involved in the creation of new infrastructure in the area, including road widening and the addition of bicycle lanes and sidewalks, and operates an extensive tree-planting and beautification program.

Between 2001 and 2013, the district more than tripled its total property value, from $600 million to over $2 billion. The amount of new office space added to the Energy Corridor between 2005 and 2015 is equivalent to the amount added during the preceding three decades. However, the 2010s oil glut put a damper on this growth, causing office and apartment vacancy rates in the area to rise significantly. Despite this slowdown, the district saw a significant increase in hospital construction during the mid-2010s, including new facilities for Texas Children's Hospital, Houston Methodist Hospital, and the M.D. Anderson Cancer Center.

ExxonMobil operated a large chemical facility in the district until 2013, when it consolidated operations in its new corporate campus in Spring.

The Energy Corridor experienced extensive inland flooding from Hurricane Harvey in August and September 2017 after historic rainfall exceeded the retention capacity of the Addicks and Barker reservoirs. The United States Army Corps of Engineers was forced to maximize discharge out of the reservoirs into Buffalo Bayou to protect the structural integrity of the dams, causing extensive downstream flooding of residential and commercial areas throughout the district, particularly along the Eldridge Parkway corridor.

== Economy ==
Largest employers in the Energy Corridor, 2016
Company	Employment
Wood Group	10,960
BP	9,537
Technip USA, Inc.	4,300
ConocoPhillips	3,000
Shell Oil Company	3,000
Baker Hughes	3,000
Endbridge	3,000
Flour Daniels	3,000

Historically, the Energy Corridor has been one of Houston's strongest office markets.

The district is the second-largest employment center in the region with more than 94,000 employees and over 300 companies.

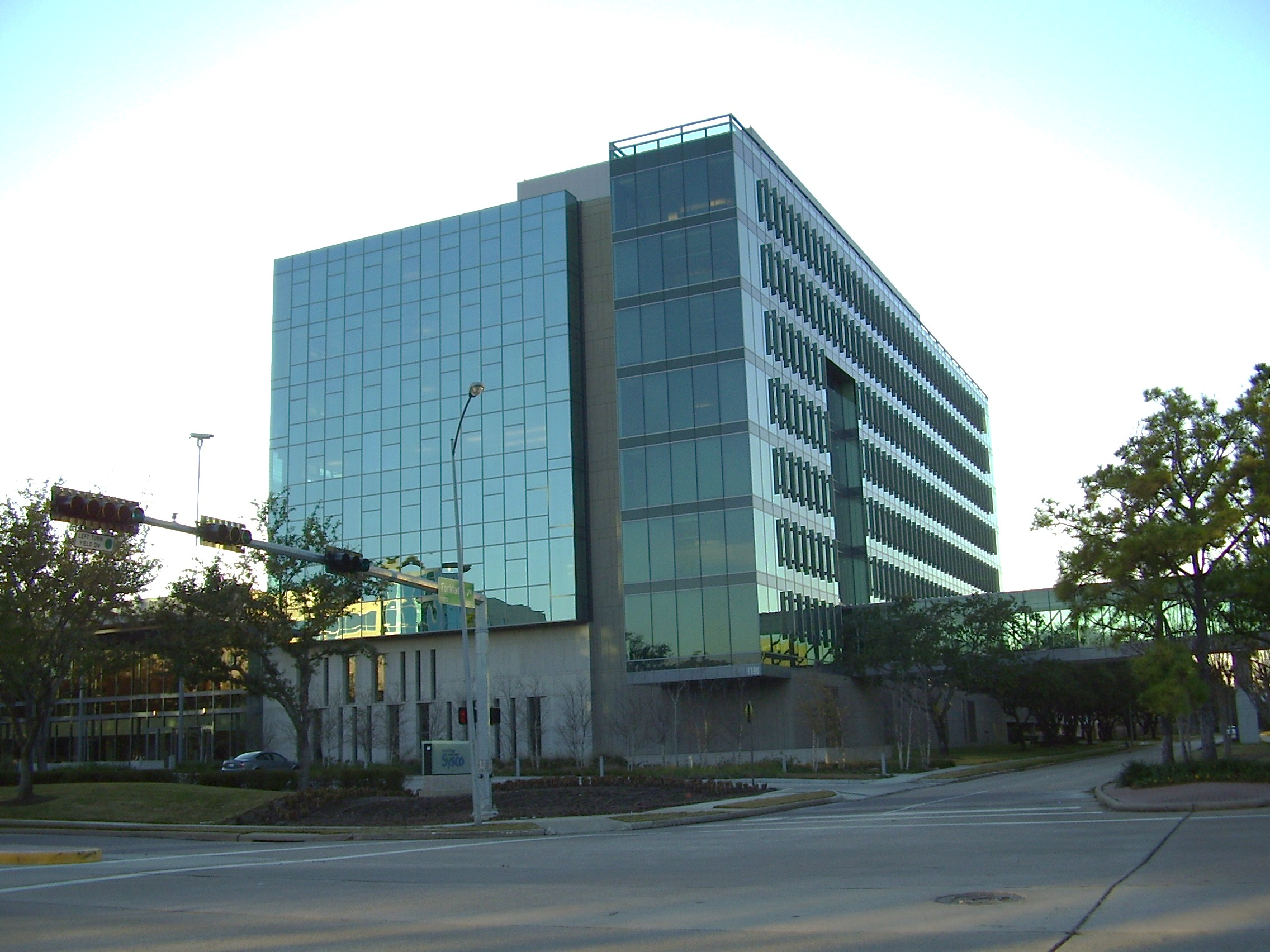
Sysco headquarters

The Energy Corridor is home to the national or international headquarters of the following companies:

- Becks Prime
- BP America at Westlake Park
- ConocoPhillips
- Citgo
- Equinor
- Foster Wheeler
- Gulf States Toyota
- McDermott International
- PCL Construction
- SBM Offshore USA
- Sysco
- Technip USA
- Wood Group
- WorleyParsons

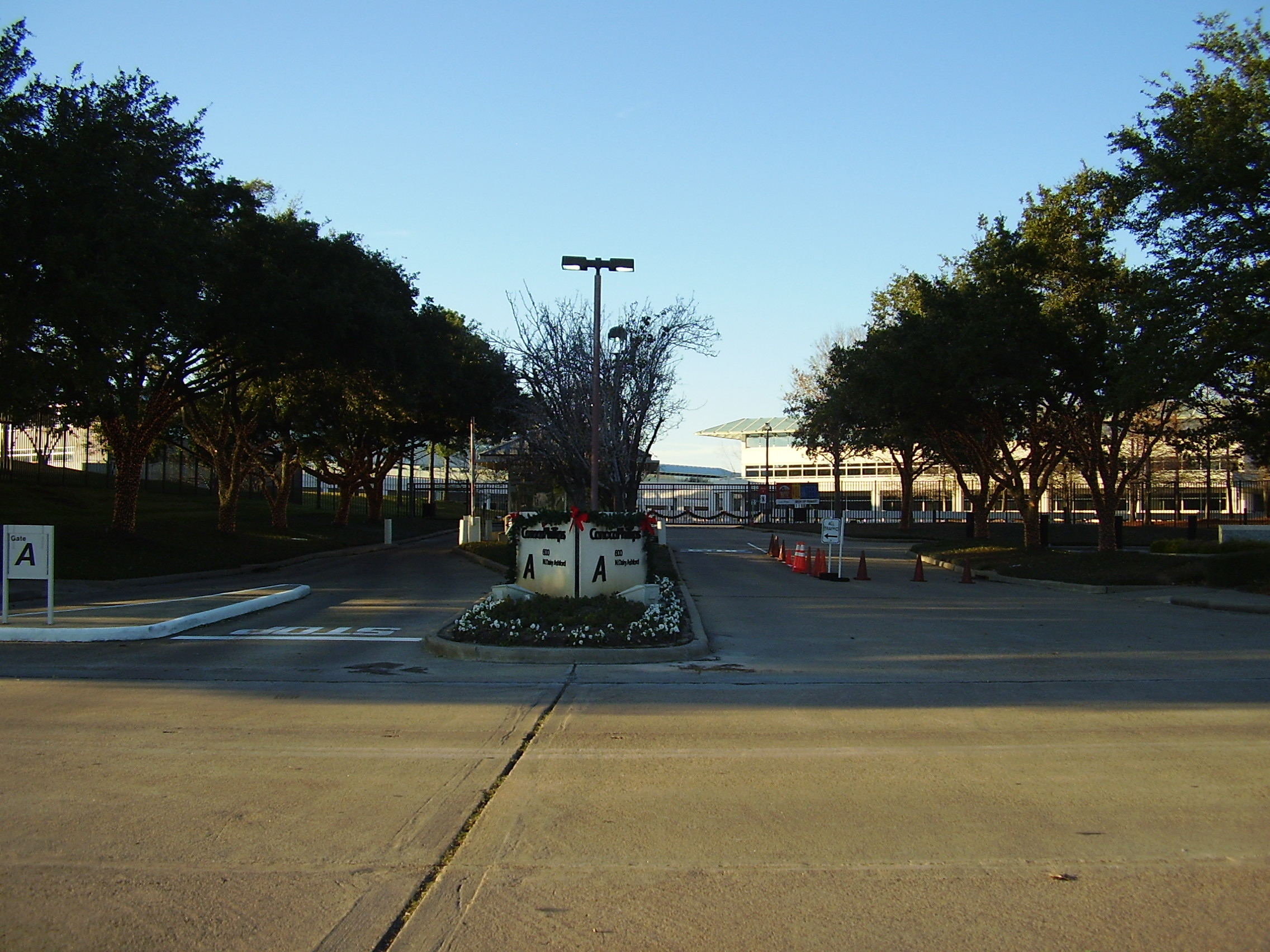
ConocoPhillips headquarters

- Kiewit Corporation
- Enbridge Energy US [Relocated US corporate office in July 2022]

Shell Oil Company, the fifth-largest employer in the Energy Corridor, operates a large campus in the district. Dow Chemical Company and Sonangol USA have offices in the area.

== Transportation ==
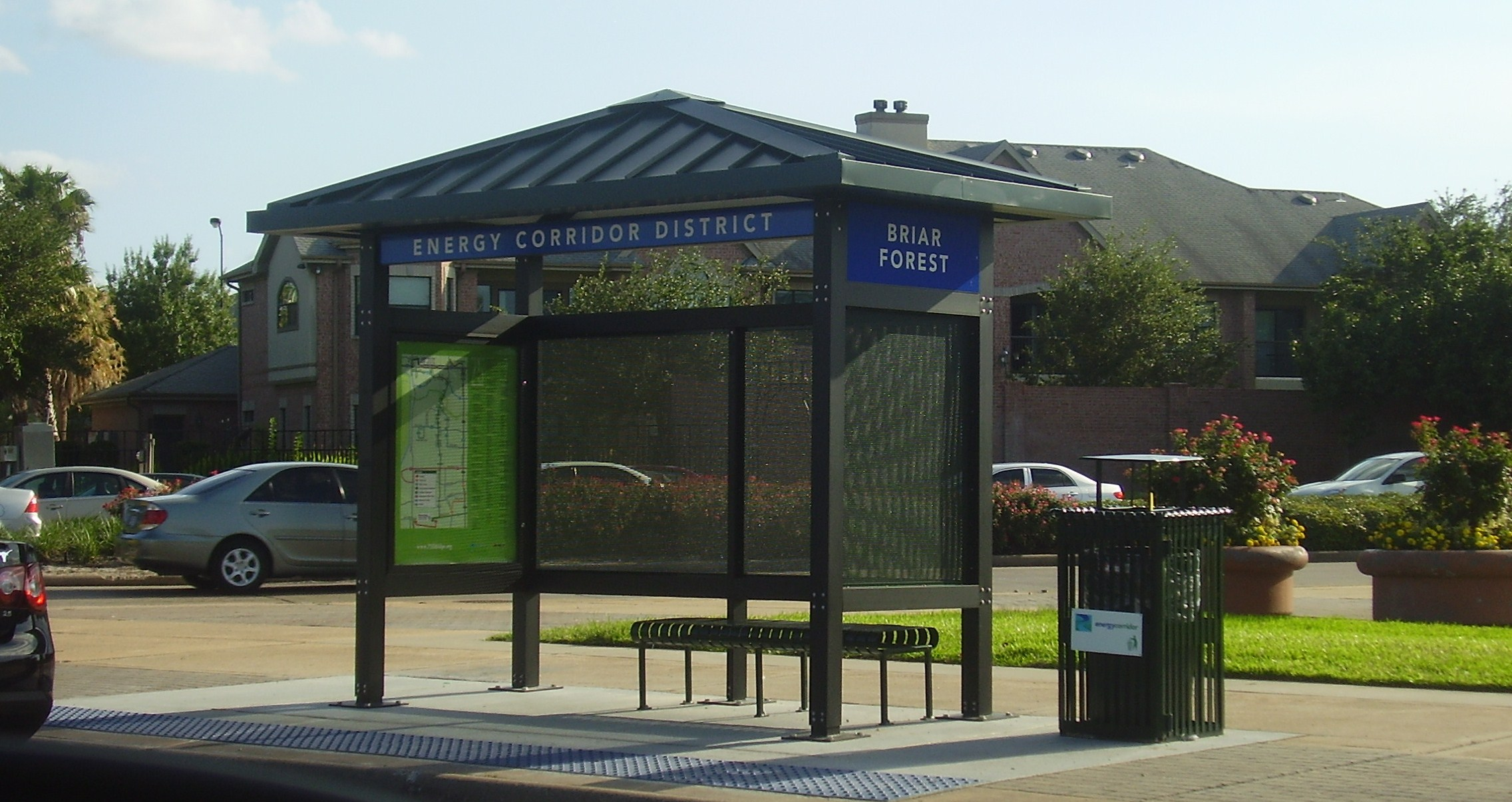
METRO bus stop

The Metropolitan Transit Authority of Harris County, Texas (METRO) provides public transportation to the area. Line 75, originally known as the Energy Corridor Connector, operates during weekdays. Commuters from Downtown Houston and Midtown Houston can connect to the 75 connector via 228 Addicks and 229 Kingsland/Addicks through the Addicks Park and Ride. The 75 connector also connects with routes along Westheimer Road and Memorial Drive. In January 2011, the name of the route was changed to 75 Eldridge Crosstown, and the southern terminus of the line was extended to Mission Bend Park and Ride, enabling more convenient connections with the Westchase district and the New Chinatown area.

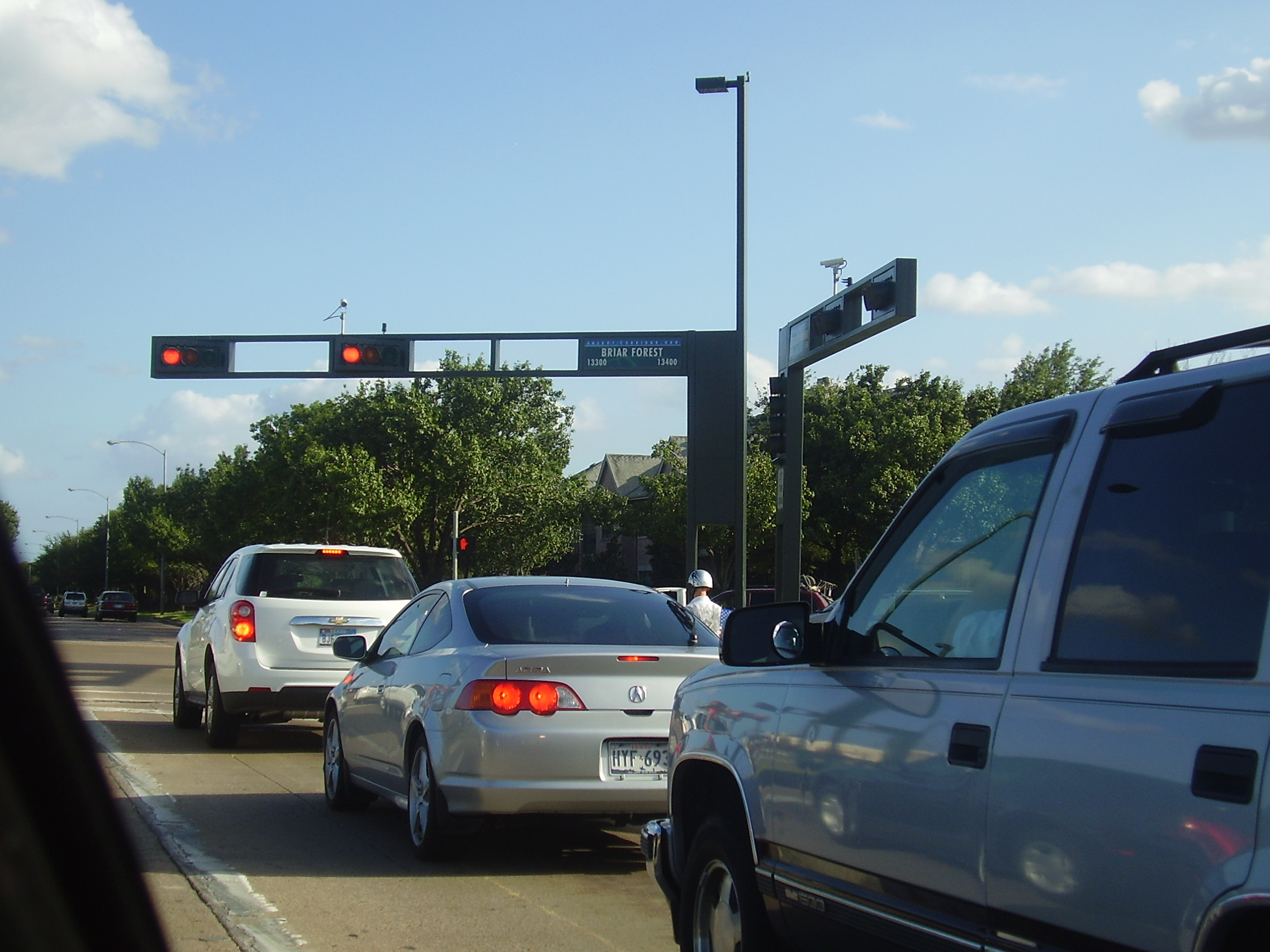
Energy Corridor intersection

Two general aviation airports serve the Energy Corridor: West Houston Airport, near Addicks Reservoir, and Houston Executive Airport in unincorporated Waller County. The latter was built to serve employees of firms in the Energy Corridor.

Two-thirds of the district's employees live within a "commute zone" spread across northern Fort Bend County, western Harris County, and southern Waller County.

== Education ==
=== Public schools ===
The southern, western and eastern areas of the Energy Corridor are served by Houston Independent School District, Katy Independent School District, and Spring Branch Independent School District, respectively.

Houston ISD residents are zoned to Ray K. Daily Elementary School, West Briar Middle School (with Revere Middle School, a STEM Magnet, as an option), and Westside High School. Residents zoned to Westside may transfer to Lamar High School.

Katy ISD residents are zoned to Wolfe Elementary School, Mayde Creek Junior High School, Mayde Creek High School, Memorial Parkway Junior High School, and James E. Taylor High School.

Spring Branch ISD residents are zoned to Nottingham Elementary School, Spring Forest Middle School, and Stratford High School.

=== Private schools ===
The Village School is near the Energy Corridor. In 2016, the British International School of Houston opened in Greater Katy to serve the district's large population of British expatriates.

=== Public libraries ===
The Houston Public Library operates the Kendall Neighborhood Library on Eldridge Parkway.

Of all HPL branches the Kendall Library received the most severe damage during Hurricane Harvey in 2017; the damage, which affected the electronic system and elevator, but not most of the books as the majority were on the library's second floor, included mold and was so severe that HPL employees re-entered the branch several days after the flood. The total level of water ranged from 4.5 feet (1.4 m) to 5 feet (1.5 m). The library afterward enacted a $4 million project post-Harvey renovation program with a tentative 2019 opening.

== Parks and recreation ==
The Energy Corridor is intersected by Terry Hershey Park, a linear park which runs east to west along Buffalo Bayou from Beltway 8 to Barker Reservoir. The district is connected to a wider trail system by trailheads at the intersection of Eldridge and Enclave and at Mayde Creek as it passes under Interstate 10. These trails connect the district to George Bush Park to the southwest.

Ray Miller Park, a neighborhood park, is located at the southern end of the district on Eldridge Parkway.

In 2015 Energy Corridor Cricket, a children's cricket club, was established.
