= Bear Creek Park =

Bear Creek Park may refer to:

- Bear Creek Cañon Park, in Colorado Springs, Colorado
- Bear Creek Regional Park and Nature Center, in Colorado Springs, Colorado
- Bear Creek Provincial Park, in British Columbia
- Bear Creek Pioneers Park, in Texas
