= Terry Hershey =

American conservationist and environmentalist

Terese ("Terry") Tarlton Hershey (19 January 1923 – 19 January 2017) was a conservationist and environmentalist. Hershey took part in the environmental movement in Texas, notably preventing the channelization of the Buffalo Bayou river in Houston. She has been called "the environmental godmother of Houston." President George H. W. Bush once called her "a force of nature for nature."

== Early life and education ==
Terese Tarlton was born on January 19, 1923. She studied at Stephens College in Columbia, Missouri and earned a bachelors of fine arts degree in philosophy at the University of Texas in 1943. She moved to Houston in 1958 and married Jake W. Hershey.

== Career ==
In 1966, Hershey became aware of the channelization and the degradation of the vegetation in the upper part of the Buffalo Bayou river. Hershey and other citizens of Houston visited the area, where they discovered that nine acres of trees had been cut down and tires were being burned in the same area. She believed that the river's destruction was due to the United States Army Corps of Engineers and along with several volunteers, sent pictures they had taken of the concrete Bayous to their congressman, George H. W. Bush. In response Bush invited Hershey to speak before the Appropriations Sub-committee, where she could request an evaluation of the work being done at the river, as well as offer suggestions of new technologies to deal with flood control.

Hershey then joined the Buffalo Bayou Preservation Association, where she formed and conducted the Buffalo Bayou campaign in order to discontinue the Army Corps Engineers activities that were harming the river. This campaign lasted from 1967 to its successful conclusion in 1971. Hershey's actions are credited as not only saving the river, but also bringing the Houston community's attention to environmental issues. Hershey's work on the campaign is also credited as leading directly to the 1972 passage of the National Environmental Policy Act, which requires that federal agencies notify the public about projects which could have negative environmental impact.

In 1991, Hershey became the second woman to be appointed to the Texas Parks and Wildlife Commission.

== Awards and legacy ==
Hershey was a member of groups, clubs and organizations that were interested in environmental issues and she served as an advocate for protecting parks in Houston. When her parents died she donated the property to the city of Fort Worth and it is now the "Wright-Tartlon Park". Hershey also founded organizations such as the Buffalo Bayou Preservation Association, Harris County Flood Control Task Force, Citizens Who Care, The Citizens Environmental Coalition, The Park People and Urban Harvest. Due to her determination and efforts, Texas has many acres of land that are being protected by conservation easements.

Hershey was inducted into the Texas Women's Hall of Fame in 1989.

In 1991, the Buffalo Bayou Park was renamed the Terry Hershey Park due to her conservation efforts.

In 1994, a Terry Hershey Award of Excellence was formed by the Department of Recreation and Tourism Sciences from the Texas A&M University, and it was formed in order to recognize the contributions and improvements to the development of recreation, parks and tourism by a practitioner, board member, elected official or volunteer. Terry Hershey was the first recipient.

Hershey was awarded the Pugsley Medal in 2003 by the American Academy for Park & Recreation Administration and she was described by her peers as a "force of nature" for her impressive works in Houston and for being a remarkable advocate in bringing people together to resolve environmental issues. Hershey also received other awards such as the prestigious Chevron Conservation Award and the Frances K. Hutchison Award.
