= Westlake Park =

Westlake Park can mean:

- Westlake Park (Seattle), a park in Seattle, Washington
- MacArthur Park, formerly Westlake Park, in Los Angeles, California
- Westlake Park (Houston), an office complex in Houston
