= Lakes on Eldridge, Texas =

Lakes on Eldridge is an unincorporated area in northwestern Harris County, Texas, United States, in Greater Houston. There is an adjacent subdivision, Lakes on Eldridge North.

It is adjacent to the Barker Reservoir and Cullen Park and is in proximity to the Houston Energy Corridor. It is equidistant to both Bush Intercontinental Airport and William P. Hobby Airport.

== History ==
Lakes on Eldridge opened in 1995 while Lakes on Eldridge North opened in 2000, with building out completed in 2006.

== Transportation ==
Nearby major freeways include Beltway 8 (Sam Houston Parkway), Interstate 10, and U.S. Route 290.

== Composition ==
As of 2013 Lakes on Eldridge has 750-800 houses, on a total of 343 acres (139 ha) of land. As of 2017 housing prices ranged between $300,000 and $1,500,000. Pocket parks serve sections of the community, and it also has a volleyball court, a clubhouse, an Olympic-sized swimming pool, and tennis courts with lighting.

Lakes on Eldridge North has over 1,000 houses. It has a fitness center, a playground, and a volleyball court. It also has three tennis courts with lighting and two swimming pools.

== Education ==
The community is within the Cypress-Fairbanks Independent School District, and is zoned to Shirley Kirk Elementary School, Truitt Middle School, and Cypress Ridge High School. Kirk Elementary, named after teacher Shirley Kirk (October 8, 1930-February 11, 2015), opened in 2000. The namesake worked for the district until she retired in 1994.

Awty International School, which includes Houston's French international school; and the British International School of Houston, maintain school bus services to Lakes on Eldridge. As of 2019 The Village School also has a bus service to/from Lakes on Eldridge and Lakes on Eldridge North.

Areas in Cy-Fair ISD (and therefore Lakes on Eldridge) are located in Lone Star College.
