= Memorial by Windsor =

Windsor Memorial
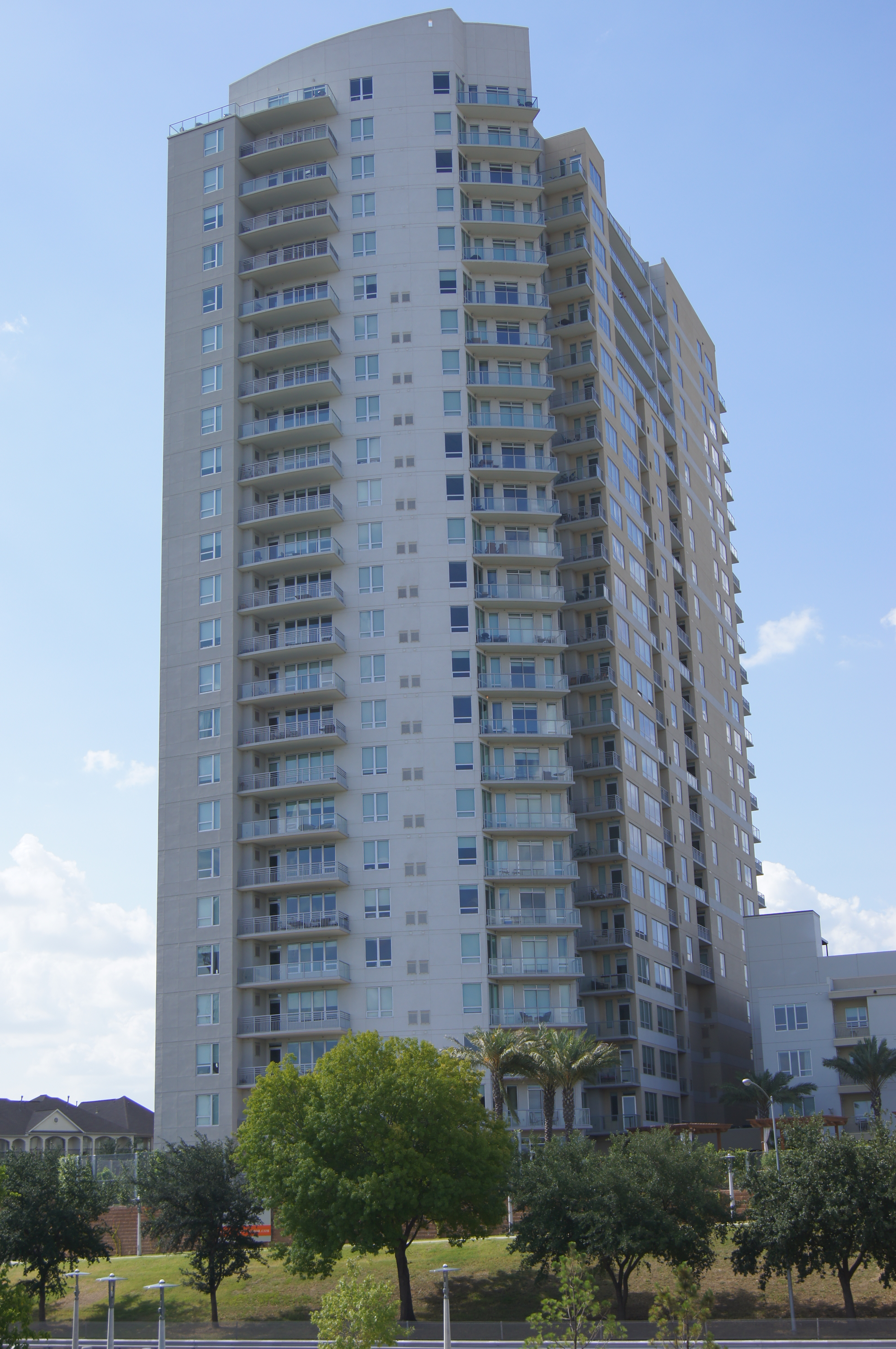
- Interactive map of the Windsor Memorial area

General information
- Status: Completed
- Type: Residential
- Location: 3131 Memorial Court, Houston, Texas
- Coordinates: 29.7638°N 95.3920°W
- Construction started: 2007
- Opening: 2010
- Cost: $60 Million
- Management: Windsor Communities

Technical details
- Floor count: 25

Design and construction
- Architect: WDG Architecture
- Developer: Legacy Partners
- Main contractor: EE Reed Construction

Windsor Memorial is a 25-story apartment building containing 274 units, with a smaller structure containing 60 lofts located on 3.3 acres (1.3 ha) and located along Memorial Drive in Houston, Texas and managed by Windsor Communities.

== See also ==
- List of tallest buildings in Houston
- List of tallest buildings in Texas
