= Brays Bayou =

Brays Bayou Braes Bayou, Bray's Bayou
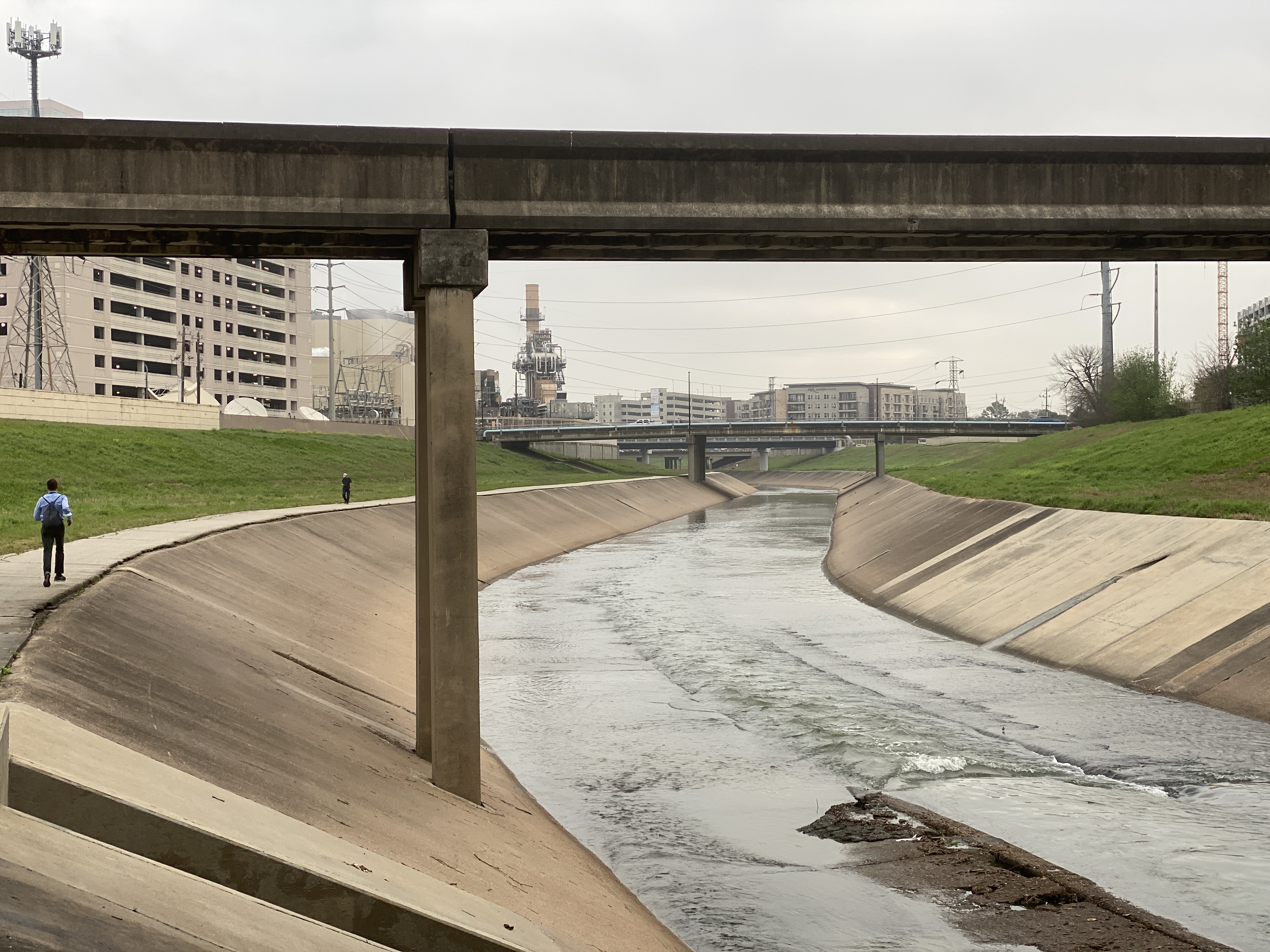
- Brays Bayou running through Houston, near Texas Medical Center

Location
- Country: United States
- State: Texas
- County: Harris

Physical characteristics
- Source: Detention basin
  - location: Western Harris County
  - coordinates: 29.712394°N 95.672520°W
- Mouth: Buffalo Bayou
  - location: Harrisburg, Houston
  - coordinates: 29.726926°N 95.276936°W
- Length: 31 miles (50 km)
- Basin size: 129 square miles (330 km^{2})

Basin features
- Population: 717,198
- Tributaries
  - left: Harris Gully
  - right: Willow Waterhole Bayou, Keegans Bayou

Brays Bayou is a slow-moving river in Harris County, Texas. A major tributary of Buffalo Bayou, the Brays flows for 31 miles (50 km) from the western edge of the county, south of Barker Reservoir along the border with Fort Bend County, east to its convergence with the Buffalo at Harrisburg. Nearly all of the river is located within the city of Houston; it is a defining geographic feature of many neighborhoods and districts, including Meyerland, Braeswood Place, the Texas Medical Center, and Riverside Terrace.

As a result of its central route through Harris County, the Brays Bayou watershed is heavily urbanized. Over 700,000 people reside within its 129-square-mile (330 km^{2}) drainage area, which contains 124 miles (200 km) of open-channel waterway, mostly from artificial drainage channels. This high level of development, combined with a relative lack of flood control infrastructure, means Brays Bayou is extremely prone to flash flooding events.

== Name ==
The origin of the name Brays Bayou is unclear, and the alternate spellings Braes and Bray's have been used throughout its history, most prominently in Braeswood Place, a neighborhood which straddles the bayou southwest of Rice University, and Braeswood Boulevard, which runs along the river between Interstate 610 and Texas State Highway 288.

Braeswood may have originated from the Scottish word brae, for hill or slope. An early settler along Brays Bayou, Henry MacGregor (the namesake of MacGregor Drive in the Third Ward), may have coined the name.

The name Brays has been used to describe the river since the arrival of the Old Three Hundred at Stephen F. Austin's colony in the 1820s. In 1822, a man named Bray settled along the bayou, possibly providing its name.

== Route ==
Brays Bayou has its source at an artificial stormwater detention basin south of Barker Reservoir in extreme western Harris County. It flows eastward, north of Mission Bend and parallel to the Westpark Tollway, into Alief. After briefly entering Westchase, the Brays turns southward, bisects the International District, and straddles the western edge of Sharpstown. After passing under Interstate 69, the bayou flows east-northeast through Meyerland, underneath the Interstate 610 loop, and past the Texas Medical Center and Hermann Park. The bayou passes under State Highway 288, enters the Third Ward, and exits into the East End after passing under Interstate 45. Significantly wider at this point, Brays Bayou then empties into Buffalo Bayou at the Houston Ship Channel and historic townsite of Harrisburg.

== History ==
The confluence of Brays and Buffalo bayous was the original focal point for Anglo-American settlement in the region with the founding of Harrisburg in 1825. In 1836, Houston was founded upstream Buffalo Bayou at the confluence with White Oak Bayou. Harrisburg would remain the region's primary trade center until after the American Civil War, when economic momentum shifted to Houston.

Other early settlements along Brays Bayou included Riceville, founded in 1850, and Alief, founded in 1861. Frequent flooding along the Brays made its floodplain ideal for growing rice, which became a cash crop in Alief through the early 20th century. As a result of its familiarity with flooding, Alief was home to the region's first flood control district, which was created in 1909.

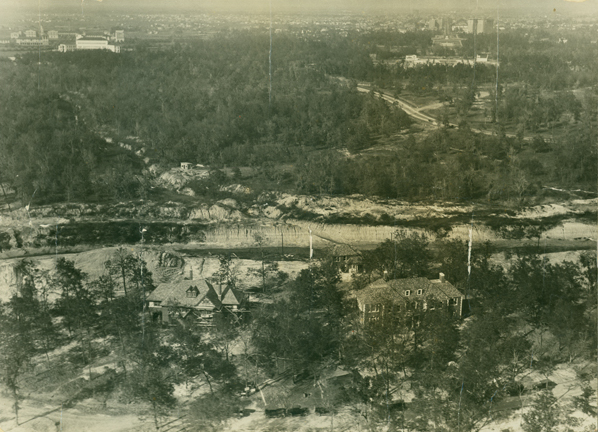
1925 view of Brays Bayou looking north. The forested area is today the Texas Medical Center. Rice University and Memorial Hermann Hospital can be seen at the top left, and Hermann Park can be seen at the top right. Harris Gully, which has been rerouted into an underground culvert, runs from the left side of the photograph into Brays.

By the first half of the 20th century, suburbs of Houston had reached the banks of Brays Bayou. Rice University was established on a large plot of land adjacent to Harris Gully, a tributary of the bayou, in 1912, and the University of Houston was established just north of the bayou in the Third Ward in 1927. Harrisburg was annexed by the city in 1926. During the 1930s, Riverside Terrace, south of the Third Ward, became home to the large forested estates of Houston's wealthy Jewish community, which had been segregated out of River Oaks. The Texas Medical Center began in the 1940s with the construction of the MD Anderson Cancer Center. Meyerland, located immediately west of the southwest corner of Interstate 610, was opened in 1955 as one of Houston's first master-planned communities. Brays Bayou continues to serve as a greenway connecting these affluent neighborhoods and districts.

Like many other Houston bayous, Brays Bayou was channelized by the United States Army Corps of Engineers between 1955 and 1960 after severe flooding earlier in the decade. By 1980, the Brays Bayou watershed was home to a population of over 412,000, and inadequate drainage infrastructure was still a major concern. A 1976 flood caused major damage to the Medical Center, Rice University, the University of Houston, and institutions in the Museum District. Beginning in the 1970s, the Harris County Flood Control District began implementing restrictions on upstream development to reduce the likelihood of flooding.

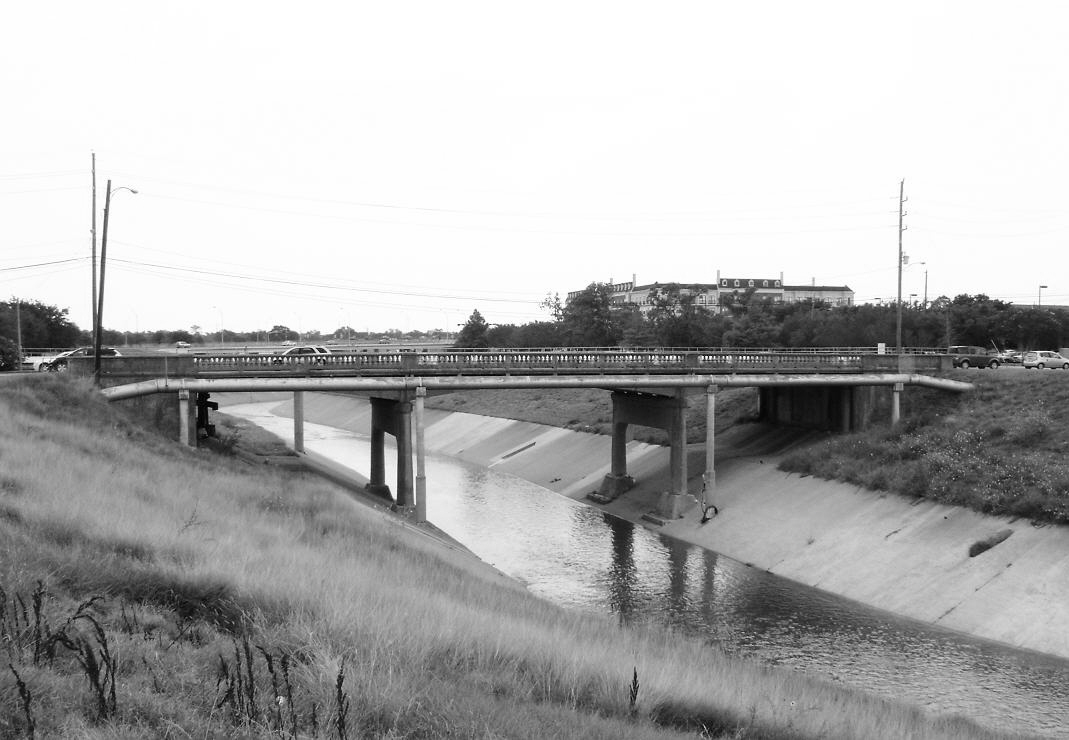
Almeda Road bridge over Brays Bayou near Hermann Park.

In 2001, Tropical Storm Allison, the most destructive tropical storm in U.S. history, devastated the Brays Bayou watershed. 6,000 homes along the Brays were flooded, and the Texas Medical Center was inundated, damaging important medical facilities. Damage to the University of Texas Health Science Center alone exceeded $740 million ($1.2 billion in 2024 dollars).

In May 2015, an extreme rainfall event flooded over 400 homes in Meyerland. One year later, in April 2016, the neighborhood was again impacted by floods. In 2017, the area was hit by significantly more severe flooding due to Hurricane Harvey.

== Project Brays ==
The Brays Bayou Federal Flood Risk Reduction Project, also known as Project Brays, is an ongoing $480 million project by the U.S. Army Corps of Engineers and the Harris County Flood Control District (HCFCD) to retrofit the Brays Bayou watershed with new and improved flood control infrastructure. Overall, the project includes 75 individual components, including deepening and widening 21 miles (34 km) of the bayou, modifying or reconstructing 30 road bridges, and constructing four large stormwater detention basins with a total capacity of 3.5 billion US gallons (13×10^{9} L).

Planning for Project Brays began in 1988 when the Army Corps of Engineers released a cost–benefit analysis for a flood damage reduction project in the Brays watershed. The Harris County Flood Control District took over planning and implementation of the project in 1998, and construction began in 2001. The project, which has a tentative completion date of 2021, has been continuously delayed by gaps in federal funding, though the urgency of the 2015 and 2016 floods has hastened efforts to complete it.

Once completed, Project Brays will remove 15,000 structures from the 100-year (0.1%) floodplain.

== Parkland ==
The Brays Bayou Greenway serves as an important linear park through a broad region of Houston, providing 30 miles (48 km) of grade-separated hike-and-bike trails. Under the City of Houston's Bayou Greenways 2020 project, Brays Bayou has been the focus of a number of projects to fill gaps in the trail network, add new park space, and provide increased connectivity to adjacent neighborhoods and across the bayou.

Public parks which connect to the greenway include (from west to east): Mike Driscoll Park, Arthur Storey Park, Hermann Park, MacGregor Park, and Mason Park. Arthur Storey Park doubles as a large stormwater detention basin which can hold up to 1.1 billion US gallons (4.2×10^{9} L) (about 3,376 acre feet) of water during flood events.

== Deaths ==
Every year, dead bodies are recovered from the bayous in Houston. In 2025 a sudden and unexplained rise in bayou deaths was registered. In September 2025 alone, 7 bodies were found in Houston's bayous, and in all of 2025 (so far) the number is double that of 2023, of which at least five in Brays Bayou, giving rise to wild speculation as to the causes, such as the actions of a serial killer, an option that is considered highly unlikely by the Houston Police. Officially, most of the deaths are reported as having an undetermined cause.

== See also ==
- Buffalo Bayou
- List of rivers of Texas
