= Westlake Park (Houston) =

Office complex in Houston, Texas

Coordinates: 29.7812°N 95.6305°W

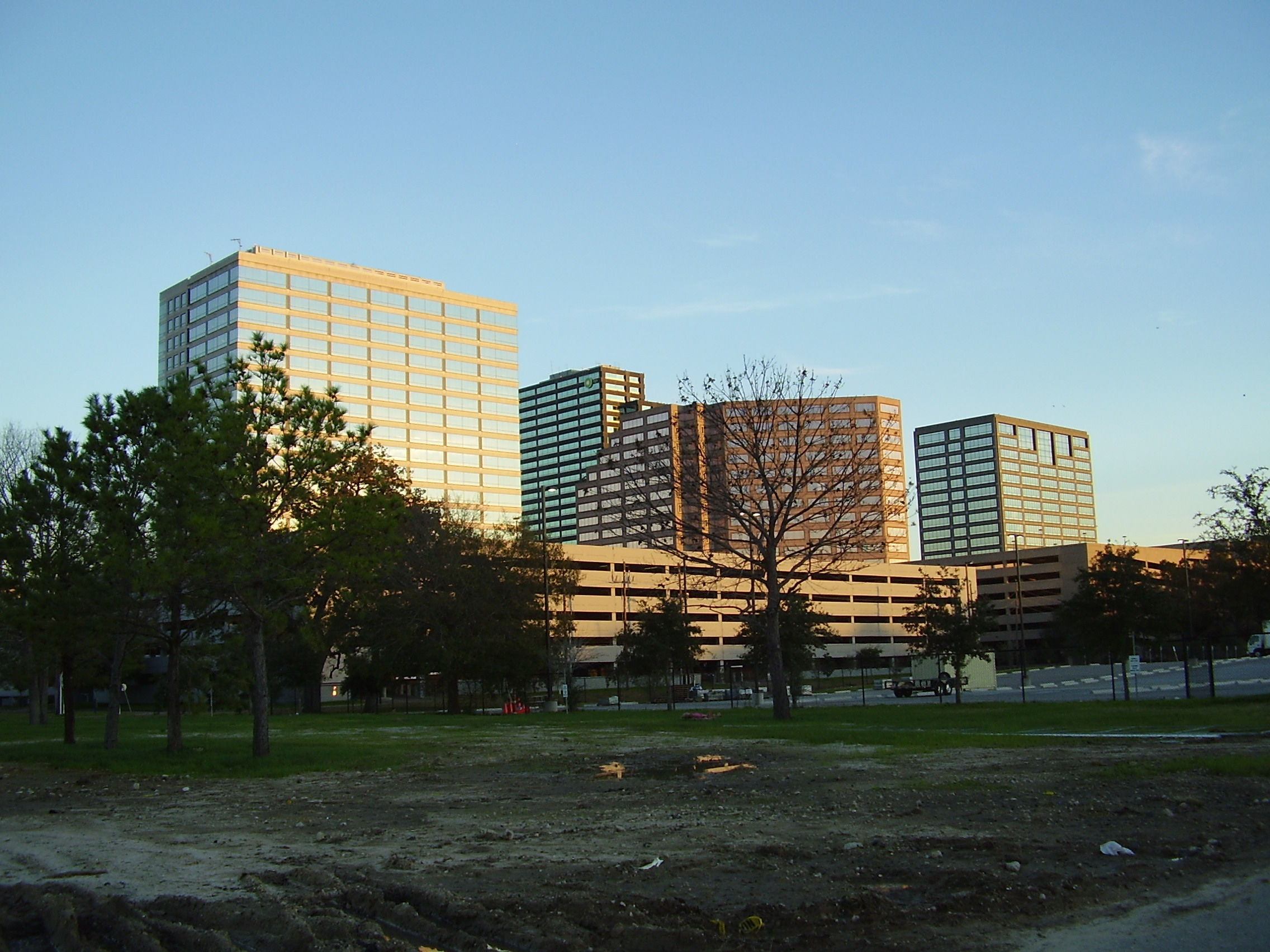
Westlake Park

Westlake Park is a 58-acre (23 ha) office complex located in the Energy Corridor, Houston, Texas, United States. The complex, located east of Texas State Highway 6 between Interstate 10 and Memorial Drive, consists of One Westlake Park, Two Westlake Park, and Three Westlake Park. Hines was the developer of the complex, and Skidmore, Owings and Merrill was the architect of the complex. The complex, with a net rentable area of 401,000 square feet (37,300 m^{2}) and 3,635 square feet (337.7 m^{2}) of retail space, has BP, KBC Advanced Technologies, Mariner Energy, and Oxy Permian as major tenants.

== Composition ==
One Westlake Park consists of a 28-story building and a 5-story building, with a total of 949,968 square feet (88,254.9 m^{2}). The complex contains the BP Americas headquarters.

The 17 story Two Westlake Park, which contains 381,327 square feet (35,426.4 m^{2}) of space, was completed in 1982. The building, which contains Class A office space. The building includes the 55,000 square feet (5,100 m^{2}) WestLake Club, an athletic and social club, is located on a 5 acres (2.0 ha) plot of land. The tower is just over 97 percent occupied. Tenants include ConocoPhillips, BP and Merrill Lynch. Younan Properties bought the building on September 26, 2007 from Wind Realty Partners of Chicago. Zaya Younan, chairman and chief executive officer of Younan Properties, said that he wanted to be the largest office landlord in the Bayou City. The purchase of the Two Westlake Park gave the firm a total of 1,700,000 square feet (160,000 m^{2}) of Class A office space in Houston.

The 20 story Three Westlake Park, which contains 428,000 square feet (39,800 m^{2}) of space, was completed in 1983. A 1,247 car parking garage is located next door to Three Westlake Park. In 2002 an affiliate of General Electric Pension Trust gained an 80% interest in the property for about $47 million. At the end of September 2006 Three Westlake Park was almost 100% occupied. Its tenants included Amoco, ConocoPhillips and ExxonMobil. On December 11, 2006 a joint venture of the GE affiliate and Crescent Real Estate Equities Co. sold the building to Falcon Real Estate. Crescent expected to acquire about $17 million in net income.

Four Westlake Park, which was a park of the complex, has 561,065 square feet (52,124.6 m^{2}). In 2006 an affiliate of GE Pension Trust and Crescent Real Estate Equities Co. sold the building to Falcon Real Estate. As of June 30, 2006, BP occupied more than 90 percent of the building.

The WestLake Child Development Center is the on-site daycare.
