= George Bush Park =

Public park in Houston, TX

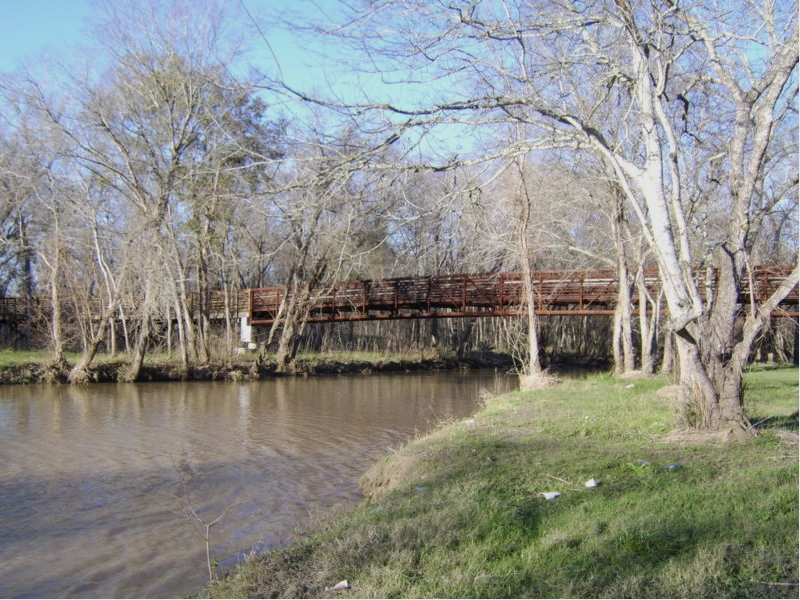
- Hike/bike trail crossing Buffalo Bayou in George Bush Park
- Interactive map of George Bush Park
- Type: public park, wildlife sanctuary
- Location: Houston, Texas
- Coordinates: 29°43′29.33″N 95°41′22.20″W
- Area: 7,800 acres (32 km^{2})
- Created: 1940s
- Operator: Harris County Precinct Four Commissioner - Lesley Briones

George Bush Park is a county park in Houston, Texas, United States, located on the far west side of the city. Situated entirely within Barker Reservoir, a large flood control structure, the park covers 7,800 acres (32 km^{2}), most of which is undeveloped forest used for the storage of floodwater. A variety of public recreation facilities are located along Westheimer Parkway, which bisects the park, including soccer and baseball field complexes, a shooting range, and a dog park. Named in honor of former Houston-area U.S. Representative and President George H. W. Bush, the park was known as Cullen–Barker Park until 1997.

== Overview ==
The large park, located on the far west side of Houston, serves as an attraction and nature reserve for the Buffalo Bayou, a major water source in the park. Since the park is entirely located within the normally dry Barker Reservoir, it is subject to routine flooding and closure during times of high rainfall.

Most of the attractions are located on Westheimer Parkway (not to be mistaken with Westheimer Road / FM 1093), a major thoroughfare in the park. The park hosts a large group of soccer fields, baseball/softball fields, a shooting range, model aircraft flying fields, and numerous pavilions, playgrounds, ponds and jogging trails. The park is also a popular geocaching destination.

== History ==
Before the area was known as part of Houston, the marsh was part of the Stephen F. Austin colony. After settlers in the area moved out of the park, much of its land was sold to ranchers.

In the 1880s, a railway named the Texas Western Narrow Gauge Railroad ran trains from Houston to surrounding areas. Barely lasting one decade, the line was forced to shut down due to bankruptcy, yet still the park considers it a heritage.

Cattle and farms occupied the area throughout the early 1900s, until it became parkland in the mid-1940s.

The United States Army Corps of Engineers constructed Barker Reservoir in the 1940s to limit flooding along Buffalo Bayou in Houston. The present area occupies about half of the original area.

The park stayed under the name Cullen–Barker Park until January 1997, when Harris County Commissioner Steve Radack proposed the name George Bush Park in honor of the 41st President of the United States, George H. W. Bush. In May of that year, the former president attended the opening ceremony, and the park received its new name.

On September 13, 2011, during the 2010–13 Southern United States and Mexico drought, a significant wildfire broke out within the park. At its zenith, the fire was 1 mile (1.6 km) wide, consuming over 1,500 acres (610 hectares) of reservoir grassland. Shortly afterward, a man was arrested in connection with the blaze, but charges were dropped and the arson investigation was inconclusive.

== Facilities ==
=== Jogging & biking trails ===
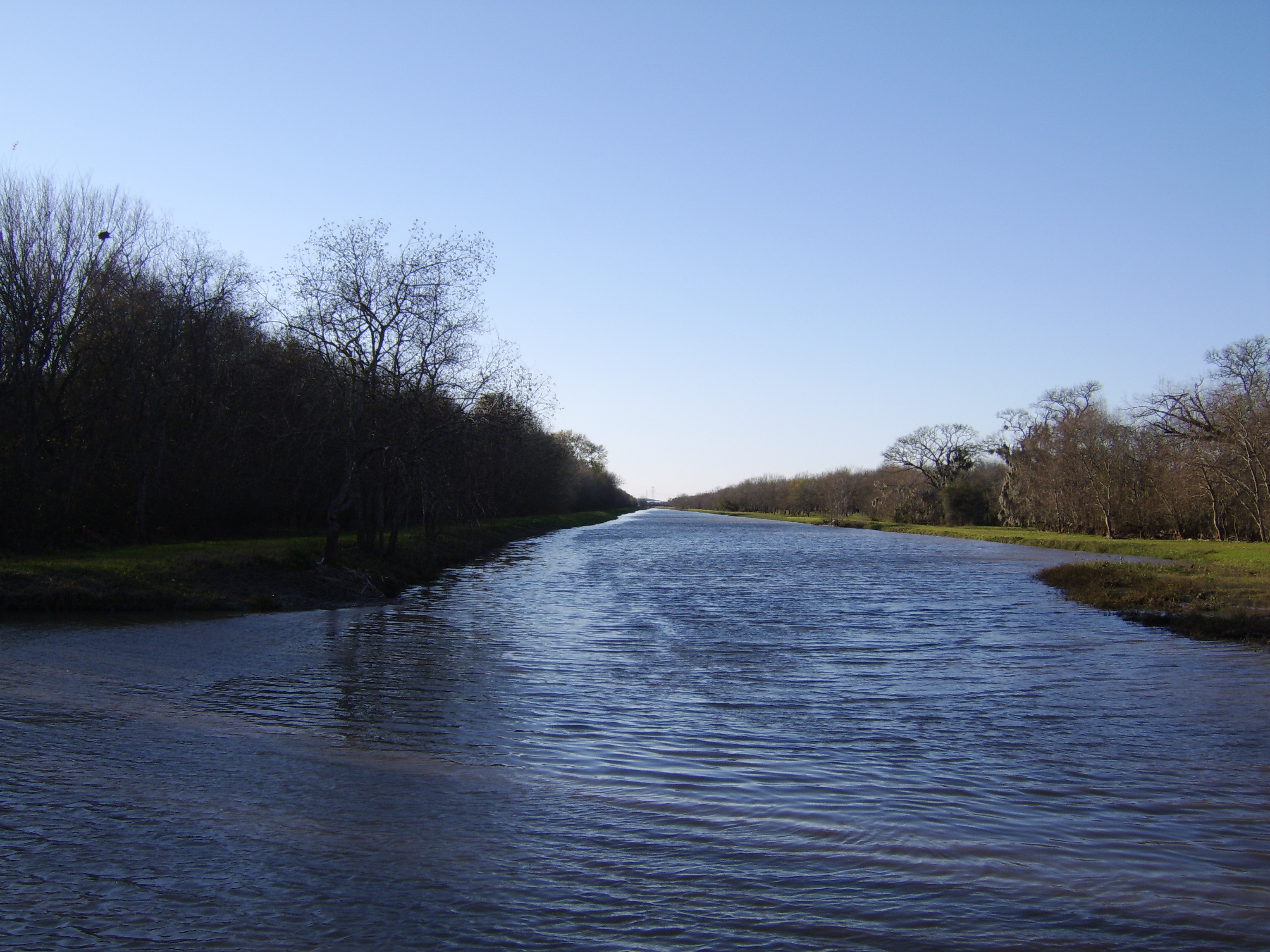
Looking westward along an artificial channel in the park

The park has a system of jogging trails, many surrounded by swamps, forest, and bayous. Many of the trails follow the Buffalo Bayou, and biking is popular year-round. The trail is well known for its flexibility in biking; many speed bikers ride the trails. It is very similar to the nearby Terry Hershey Park in that both feature paved trails. A critical shortcoming of the trail system is that the sole paved trail does not form a loop, requiring cyclists to either ride in the traffic lanes of high-speed thoroughfares or retrace their route.

In addition to the biking trail, there is a large wooden bridge that crosses the Buffalo Bayou, dubbed "the Boardwalk" officially. Capable of holding 5 tons (10,000 lbs.), the Boardwalk was a recent addition, built in 2004, mainly to cross the swampy, meandering Buffalo Bayou. The bayou flows slowly and unsteadily in the area, spilling some of its water into swamps as it conjunctions with a second bayou. The Boardwalk provides easy access across the bayou, seating, but no access to the Buffalo Bayou shoreline.

=== Sports fields ===
The park hosts two large, green soccer fields. These are commonly used for local-area teams to run practice drills. The first one is located near the western entrance, and the second, which is slightly smaller, is located near the baseball fields.

There are six baseball fields in the park. Four of them are reserved for the West Oaks Little League. The other two are public fields.

=== American Shooting Centers ===
The American Shooting Centers reserves 563 acres (2.3 km^{2}) of land near the southeast entrance for shooting. The center provides shooting fields, a gun rental/purchase shop and lessons.

The following are awards & accomplishments made by the club:

- 125+ corporate and fund-raising events
- Club of The Decade Award - Runner Up
- Home of the US Open, 1997 and 2004
- Texas State Championship - 1993, 1999, 2001, 2003
- Home of the Bayou City Classic and Browning/Briley World Open
- NSCA Club of the Year - 1997 and 2001

== See also ==
- George Bush Park — Main Page
- American Shooting Centers — Main Page
