= Bear Creek Pioneers Park =

Park in Houston, Texas, US

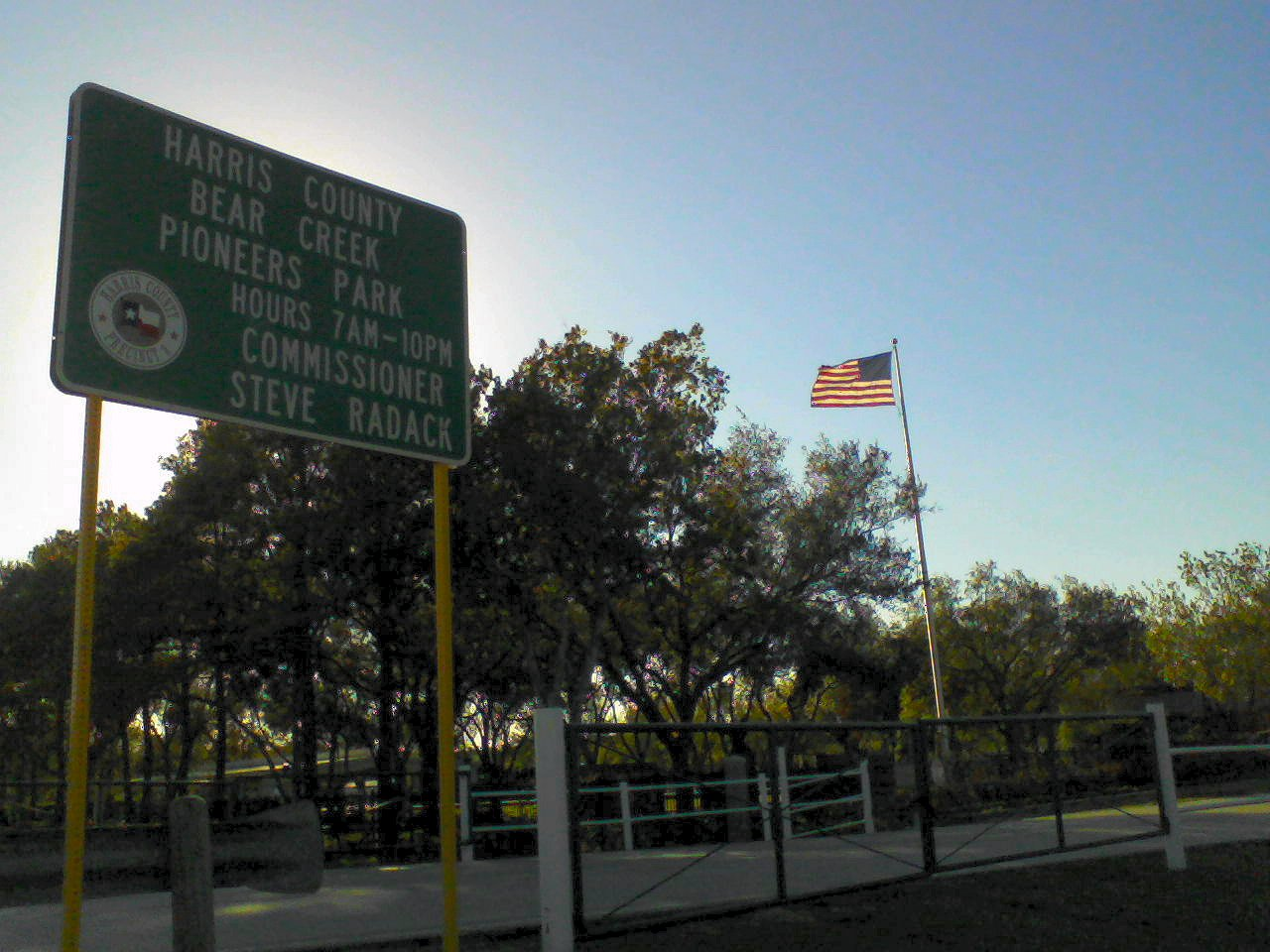
- Park entrance
- Interactive map of Bear Creek Pioneers Park
- Type: County park
- Location: Houston, Texas
- Coordinates: 29°49′29″N 95°37′29″W
- Area: 2,154 acres (8.72 km^{2})
- Created: 1965

Bear Creek Pioneers Park is a 2,154-acre (8.72 km^{2}) park located in the U.S. city of Houston, Texas, at 3535 War Memorial Drive. It is sometimes called "Harris County Bear Creek Park", or simply "Bear Creek Park."

== History ==
Between 1946 and 1948, the Addicks Reservoir was constructed by the United States Army Corps of Engineers to prevent a repetition of the sort of disastrous flooding that Houston experienced in 1935. Bear Creek Pioneers Park occupies a portion of this reservoir. The park land had previously been occupied since the 1840s by mostly German immigrant farmers and their descendants. Harris County leased 2,154 acres (8.72 km^{2}) of the reservoir in 1965 and began to develop the park.

== Park Description ==
The park is 2,154.63 acres (8.7195 km^{2}) in size and has paved roads and parking spaces that visitors can use. The park also has walking trails, an equestrian trail, a small zoo (including buffaloes, an ostrich, and emus) and aviary, playgrounds, soccer fields, little league and softball fields, a football field with a chalkboard, four lighted tennis courts, eight picnic pavilions, horseshoe courts, and hundreds of picnic tables and grills. Near the aviary ducks can be seen walking freely around a pond. The park also has restrooms all around the park and drinking water fountains. The park is open all week from 7:00 am until 10:00 pm (local time). There is no cost to enter the park but pavilions must be reserved before use. Picnic tables and grills do not need to be reserved. The park has no stores and visitors must bring their own food if they plan on eating or drinking.

== Origin of park name ==
Bear Creek Pioneers Park gets its name from one of the creeks (i.e., Bear Creek) that flow through the area. Actually, Langham Creek virtually bisects the entire park. Originally spelled "Behr" Creek due to the German immigrants whom initially settled the area in the 19th century, the name became Anglicized to "Bear Creek" as the English-speaking influence became more prevalent.

== Harris County War Memorial ==
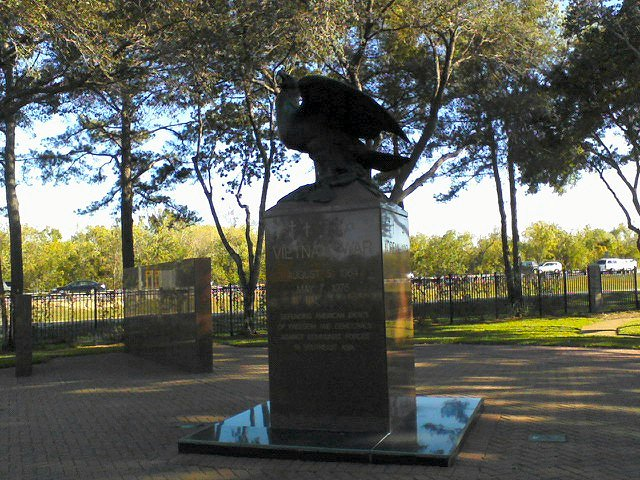
The Harris County War Memorial, located near the Eldridge entrance to the park

The Harris County War Memorial is found in this park, next to the Eldridge Parkway entrance. The Memorial was built in 1985 to honor known residents who lost their lives in World War I and the wars ever since. Memorial services are held at the War Memorial every Memorial Day at 2:00 p.m.

== Wildlife habitat ==
The wildlife habitat located in the park consists of a duck and goose pond, an aviary, and exhibits for various animals including birds of prey, peacocks, scald-crows, bison, emus, pot bellied pigs, white-tailed deer, donkeys, sheep, and goats.
