= Memorial Drive (Houston) =

Road in Houston, Texas

- Length: 20 mi (32 km)
- Location: Harris County
- From: I-45
- Major junctions: Texas Beltway 8 I-610
- To: SH 6

Construction
- Inauguration: 1955

Memorial Drive is an arterial road in the western half of Houston, Texas, United States. It runs from Interstate 45 west to State Highway 6, a distance of approximately 20 miles (32 km). A 1-mile (1.6 km) section goes through several predominantly higher-income residential neighborhoods in the cities of Houston, Bunker Hill Village, Piney Point Village, and Hunters Creek Village, in addition to Memorial Park. Memorial Drive was named in the memory of the men who served in Camp Logan. Memorial Drive also has the only cloverleaf interchange in Houston, second if the BW-8 and WPT exit is counted as one.

== History ==
Memorial Drive was established in the 1920s. In the 1940s and early 1950s, Memorial Drive was originally intended to be one of ten freeway spokes extending outward from Downtown Houston. Despite the explosive population growth in the Houston area in recent decades, the heaviest traffic on Memorial Drive was in the early 1960s. Nearly 47,000 vehicles per day traveled on the section at Waugh Drive in 1960. When the Katy Freeway opened in 1968, the road's importance as a high-speed corridor decreased. In contrast to its earlier days, between 30,000 and 36,000 vehicles per day traveled along this section in 2001.

Houston City Council member Pam Holm announced in May 2007 that a large portion, roughly one fourth of the Memorial's length, would be expanded and beautified. The stretch of road from George Bush Park eastward to Gessner Road, about 6.2 miles (9.9 km), would be renovated to meet the population boom in the west Houston area. The first part of the expansion was slated to begin in 2009.

== Path ==

The full path of Memorial Drive, highlighted in red.

=== Parkway section ===
This limited-access portion of Memorial Drive was opened to traffic in early 1956. The 2.3 mile (3.7 km) portion between Houston Avenue and Shepherd Drive is a limited-access parkway. There is an underpass at Heights Boulevard/Waugh Drive with a large cloverleaf interchange. There are also exit and entrance ramps at Shepherd Drive. Motorists can enter Memorial Drive from northbound (by way of the I-45 northbound/Pease Street distributor ramp) or southbound Houston Avenue, Prairie Street, and Capitol Street. Motorists exit either to I-45 southbound and Pierce, Jefferson and Bagby Streets (by way of the Heiner Street distributor elevated ramp), Rusk Street, or Texas Avenue. Most of this parkway is three lanes in each direction.

This section of Memorial Drive hugs the north bank of Buffalo Bayou, crossing over it twice near Glenwood Cemetery, while Allen Parkway follows the south bank of the Bayou. There are continuous bike paths and jogging trails along the road, which passes by Buffalo Bayou Park, Cleveland Park, Spotts Park, and the Houston Police Officers' Memorial.

=== Memorial Park ===
Memorial Drive is the only major road in Memorial Park (except for a short section of Woodway Drive) and the only road that traverses the entire park. Like the parkway section, there are many bicycle and jogging trails along the road. The annual Chevron Houston Marathon is held on this section of Memorial Drive each January.

=== Memorial Villages ===
After passing under Interstate 610, the road slowly winds north, through wooded but densely populated neighborhoods. The road later turns south through three of the Memorial Villages: Hunters Creek Village, Piney Point Village, and then Bunker Hill Village. The Memorial Villages are upscale neighborhoods, populated mainly by corporate executives, and feature some of the more expensive homes in the Houston area. For all but the westernmost edge of Bunker Hill Village, the road is only two lanes wide. Between Gessner Road and State Highway 6, Memorial Drive has four lanes.

=== West end ===
West of Beltway 8, Memorial Drive is considered a major road in the area, making its way through numerous residential neighborhoods on the westside and usually bordered by retail shops and strip malls, many of them serving the surrounding higher-income residential population. The upscale shopping center Town & Country Village borders this segment. This segment also passes through the northern portion of the Energy Corridor management district. The western end of Memorial Drive is at Highway 6, at the edge of a large earthen dam on Barker Reservoir, next to George Bush Park.
