= Addicks Reservoir =

- Location within Texas
- Location: Houston, Texas, United States
- Coordinates: 29°47′27″N 95°37′25″W
- Type: Reservoir
- Basin countries: United States

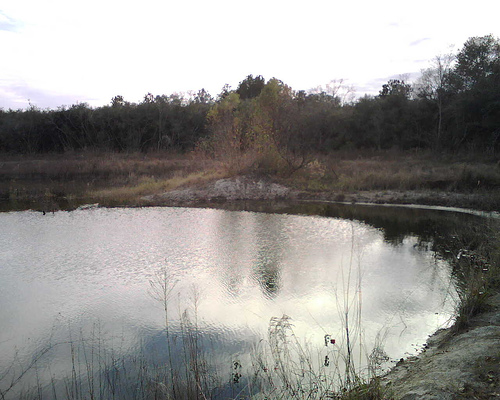
Northeastern section of the reservoir

The Addicks Reservoir and Addicks Dam in conjunction with the Barker Reservoir prevent downstream flooding of Buffalo Bayou in the city of Houston, Texas. Both reservoirs were authorized under the Rivers and Harbors Act of June 20, 1938, which was modified by the Flood Control Acts of 1938, 1954, and 1965. The US Army Corps of Engineers (USACE) completed construction of Addicks Dam and the outlet facility in 1948.

== Location ==
Addicks Reservoir is situated on the north side of Interstate 10. It extends slightly north of Clay Road and between Barker-Cypress Road to the west and Beltway 8/Sam Houston Tollway to the east. State Highway 6 (SH 6) bisects the reservoir north to south. In addition to the Reservoir's flood damage reduction mission, recreation and nature observation opportunities abound through the approximately 26,000 acres (11,000 ha) of land that makes up Addicks and Barker reservoirs, which are often dry wooded areas in normal times. The West Houston Airport is located within the western edge of the Addicks Reservoir, between Barker-Cypress Road and SH 6.

The Addicks Reservoir spillway is located at 29°47′26″N 95°37′24″W and releases the remainder of Bear Creek just north of Buffalo Bayou.

Addicks Reservoir and Dam get their name from the former town of Addicks, Texas, named after its original postmaster, Henry Addicks.

== Construction ==
Addicks Reservoir is formed by a rolled earthen dam 61,666 feet (18,796 m) long and above the streambed. A 12-foot-wide (3.7 m) gravel road extends along the top of the dam. The top of the dam has a maximum elevation of 121 feet (37 m) above the North American Vertical Datum of 1988 (NAVD 1988) and is almost 50 feet (15 m) high in points. The maximum storage capacity of the reservoir is 201,000 acre-feet (248 GL), The record high water level for the reservoir prior to Hurricane Harvey was 123,100 acre-feet (151.8 GL), set on April 24, 2016.

During Hurricane Harvey, the level peaked at 109.1 feet (33.3 m) on August 30, 2017, becoming the highest recorded level for Addicks Reservoir. Water retention at this level was 217,500 acre-feet (268.3 GL). Combined with the adjacent Barker Reservoir to the southwest, the total storage capacity is about 410,000 acre-feet (510 GL).

From 2008 to 2014, the USACE Galveston District implemented $4.4 million (equivalent to $5.73 million in 2024) in interim risk reduction measures (at Addicks and Barker dams) to address deficiencies until long-term solutions could be identified and executed. In 2014, staff completed a Dam Safety Modification Study to evaluate long-term repairs and address issues associated with the dams. Staff presented this information during a public meeting on October 29 at Bear Creek Community Center in Houston to discuss these plans and gather feedback. Construction is scheduled to begin in May 2015 with an estimated completion date of 2019.

The northern and western ends of the dam consist of roller-compacted concrete spillways. The existing ground at either end of Addicks Dam is lower than the top of the dam elevation. The existing ground at the north end of Addicks Dam is at an elevation of 108 feet (33 m) and ties into the concrete spillway crest at 112.5 feet (34.3 m). The existing ground at the western end is at an elevation of 111.0 feet (33.8 m) and ties into the concrete spillway which has a crest of 115.5 feet (35.2 m). (All elevations are NAVD 1988.)

== Controlled release ==
On August 28, 2017, during flooding from Hurricane Harvey, USACE began controlled water releases at both the Addicks and Barker reservoirs, in an attempt to manage flood levels in the immediate area. The waters continued to rise, and on August 29, after reaching pool elevation over 108 feet (33 m) above NAVD 1988, the Addicks Reservoir began around the end of the dam near Tanner Road. Flows less than 100 cubic feet per second (2,800 L/s) were detected at the spillway. In the afternoon of August 29, 2017, USACE decided to raise the controlled release rates to 16,000 cubic feet per second (450,000 L/s). As of August 30, 2017, combined controlled discharge rates of Barker and Addicks were 13,700 cubic feet per second (390,000 L/s), and subdivisions surrounding the outlets and downstream past Beltway 8/Sam Houston Tollway experienced significantly increased flooding as Buffalo Bayou further overtopped its banks.

== Development controversy ==
When the Addicks and Barker reservoirs were originally constructed, USACE acquired approximately 24,500 acres (9,900 ha) of land even though, at the time, it was known that an additional 8,000 acres (3,200 ha) could be inundated at full pool. Initially, these additional acres were largely agricultural land where the consequences of flooding would be minimal. Harris County and Houston City authorities permitted developers to build residential neighborhoods (such as the Lakes on Eldridge subdivision) on this privately owned land within the basins of the reservoirs. Today, about 14,000 homes are located inside the reservoir basins. Many residents complained after Hurricane Harvey that they were not informed that their homes were located inside a reservoir basin. Beginning in the 1990s, Fort Bend County, which contains a portion of Barker Reservoir, began requiring that plat documents for land within the basin carry a one-sentence disclosure of possible "controlled inundation".

== Government-induced flooding and ensuing litigation ==
During and after Hurricane Harvey, 7,000 acres (2,800 ha) of private upstream land was deliberately submerged by the USACE operation of the Addicks and Barker dams and reservoirs. In response, upstream property owners filed a series of lawsuits in the US Court of Federal Claims (CFC), seeking to hold the US government liable for the induced flooding under the "Takings Clause" of the Fifth Amendment.

Given the large number of lawsuits, the CFC decided to handle the cases as a group by using case management methods commonly employed in multi-district litigation. To that end, and after considering hundreds of applications, the CFC appointed attorneys Armistead "Armi" Easterby, Daniel Charest, and Charles Irvine to serve as co-lead trial counsel for upstream plaintiffs. The CFC also selected 13 property owners for a bellwether trial to determine causation and liability issues common to the upstream property owners.

Federal Claims Judge Charles Lettow presided over the May 2019 liability trial, which was held in Houston, Texas. On December 17, 2019, the CFC held that the upstream flooding constituted a Fifth Amendment taking. The decision detailed how US government officials knowingly and intentionally imposed flooding on upstream private property and that the victims living near the federally owned reservoirs did not know their property was in a federal flood-control project's reservoir flood pool. During trial, government lawyers stated this litigation is the largest Fifth Amendment "Takings Clause" case in US history.

In June 2022, Judge Lettow presided over a two-week trial addressing the amounts owed to six bellwether plaintiffs by the US under the Fifth Amendment's "Takings Clause". In October 2022, the CFC issued its just compensation decision finding in favor of the bellwether plaintiffs. The six bellwether plaintiffs received awards for decreased real property values, damaged or destroyed personal property, and costs for the owners being displaced. Total compensation for the around 10,000 upstream property owners who suffered government-induced flooding could reach or exceed $1.7 billion before interest. The six-year statute of limitations for filing a lawsuit in the CFC is set to expire in August 2023.

== Buffalo Bayou and Tributaries Resiliency Study Interim Report ==
In October 2020, USACE published an interim report regarding the Addicks and Barker dams and reservoirs. The interim report states that high reservoir water levels resulting from USACE's operation of the Addicks and Barker dams "pose unacceptable risks to health and human safety, private property, and public infrastructure" and that "future economic damages from flooding are likely" in the upstream area. The interim report further indicates that there is inadequate government-owned real estate for dam operations, as more than 20,000 homes and 24,000 parcels of privately owned upstream land are within the areas subject to government-induced flooding. The total acquisition cost to acquire these lands would be approximately $10 billion.
