= Buffalo Bayou =

Body of water in the U.S. state of Texas

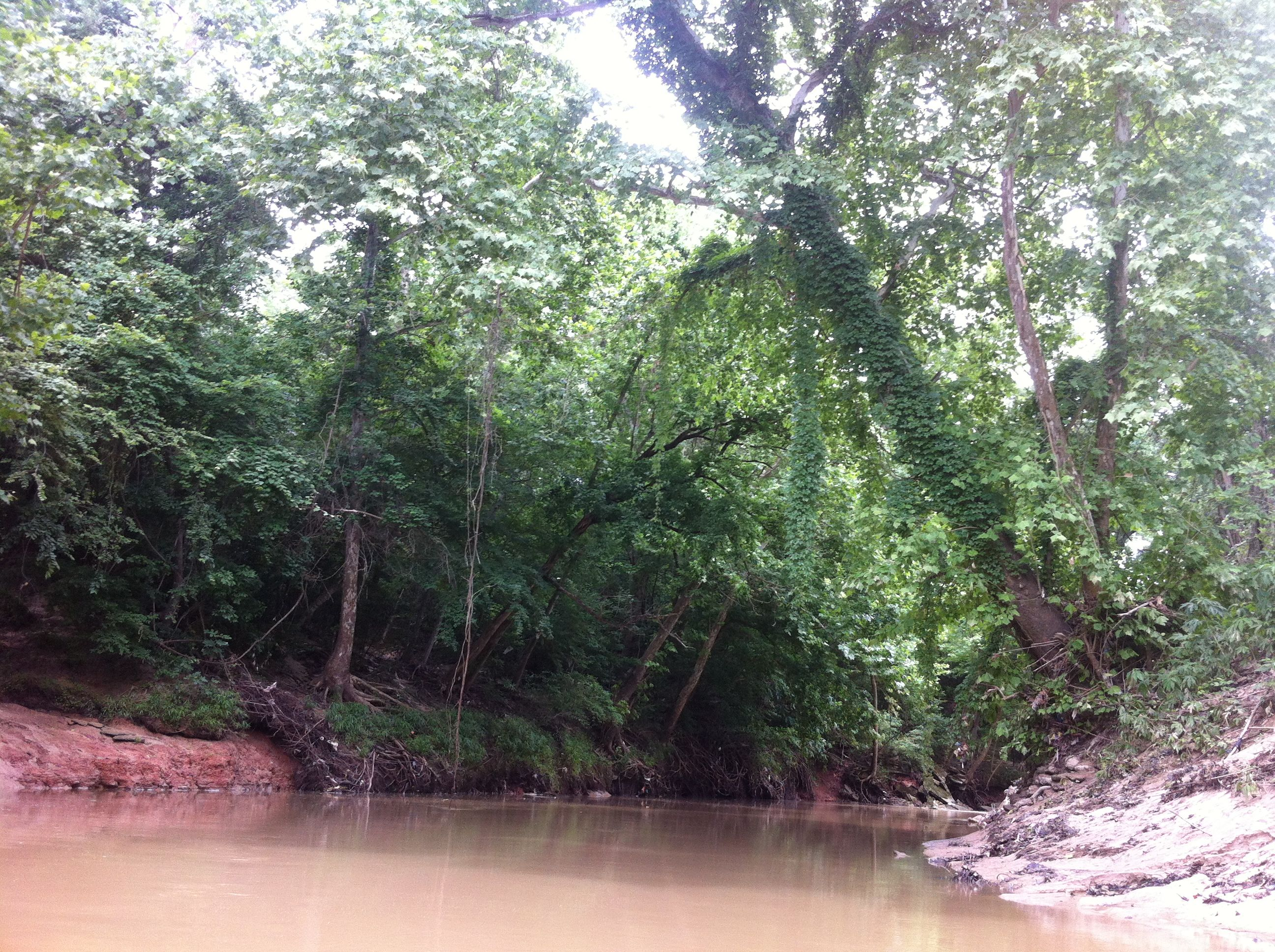
- An unchannelized section of Buffalo Bayou near Memorial Park in Houston

Location
- Country: United States
- State: Texas
- Counties: Fort Bend, Harris

Physical characteristics
- Source: Junction of Willow Fork and Cane Island Branch
  - location: Katy, Texas
  - coordinates: 29.767895°N 95.825756°W
- Mouth
  - location: Galveston Bay
  - coordinates: 29.761408°N 95.086903°W
- Length: 53 miles (85 km)
- Basin size: 500 square miles (1,300 km^{2})

Basin features
- Population: 440,000
- Tributaries
  - left: Mayde Creek, Turkey Creek, Rummel Creek, Spring Branch, White Oak Bayou, Hunting Bayou, Greens Bayou, San Jacinto River
  - right: Brays Bayou, Sims Bayou, Vince Bayou
- Inland ports: Houston Ship Channel, Port of Houston

Buffalo Bayou is a slow-moving river which flows through Houston in Harris County, Texas. It was formed 18,000 years ago, flowing east for 53 miles (85 km) from Katy, Fort Bend County to the Gulf of Mexico. It flows through and connects many Houston waterways including the Addicks and Barker reservoirs, the Brays Bayou, Carpenters Bayou, Greens Bayou, Sims Bayou, and White Oak Bayou, as well as other natural springs and surface runoff. Additionally, Buffalo Bayou is considered a tidal river downstream of a point 440 yards (400 m) west of the Shepherd Drive bridge in west-central Houston.

As the principal river of Greater Houston, the Buffalo Bayou watershed is heavily urbanized. Its 102-square-mile (260 km^{2}) direct drainage area contains a population of over 440,000. Including tributaries, the bayou has a watershed area of approximately 500 square miles (1,300 km^{2}).

== Route ==
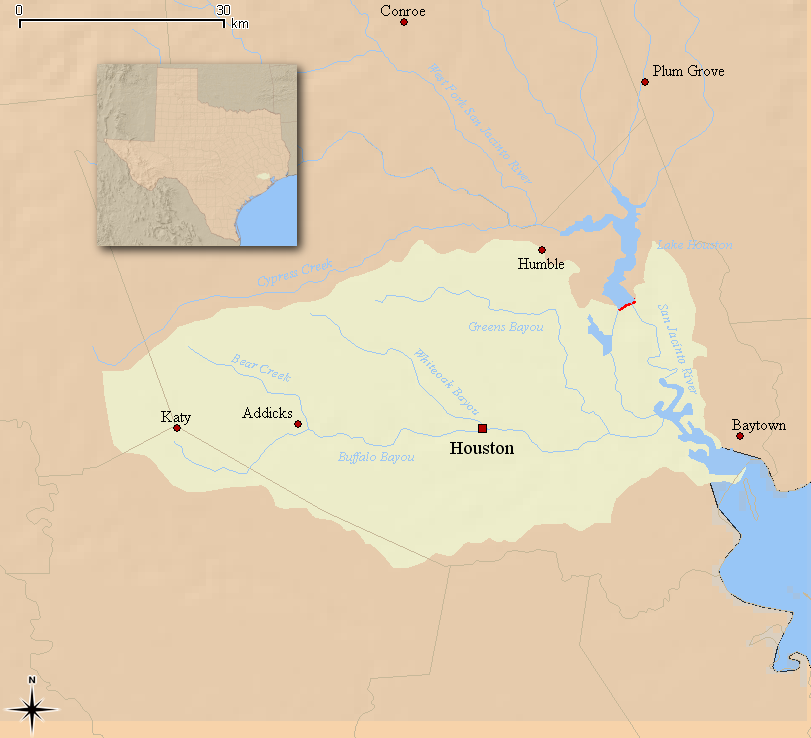
Map of the Buffalo Bayou and associated watershed

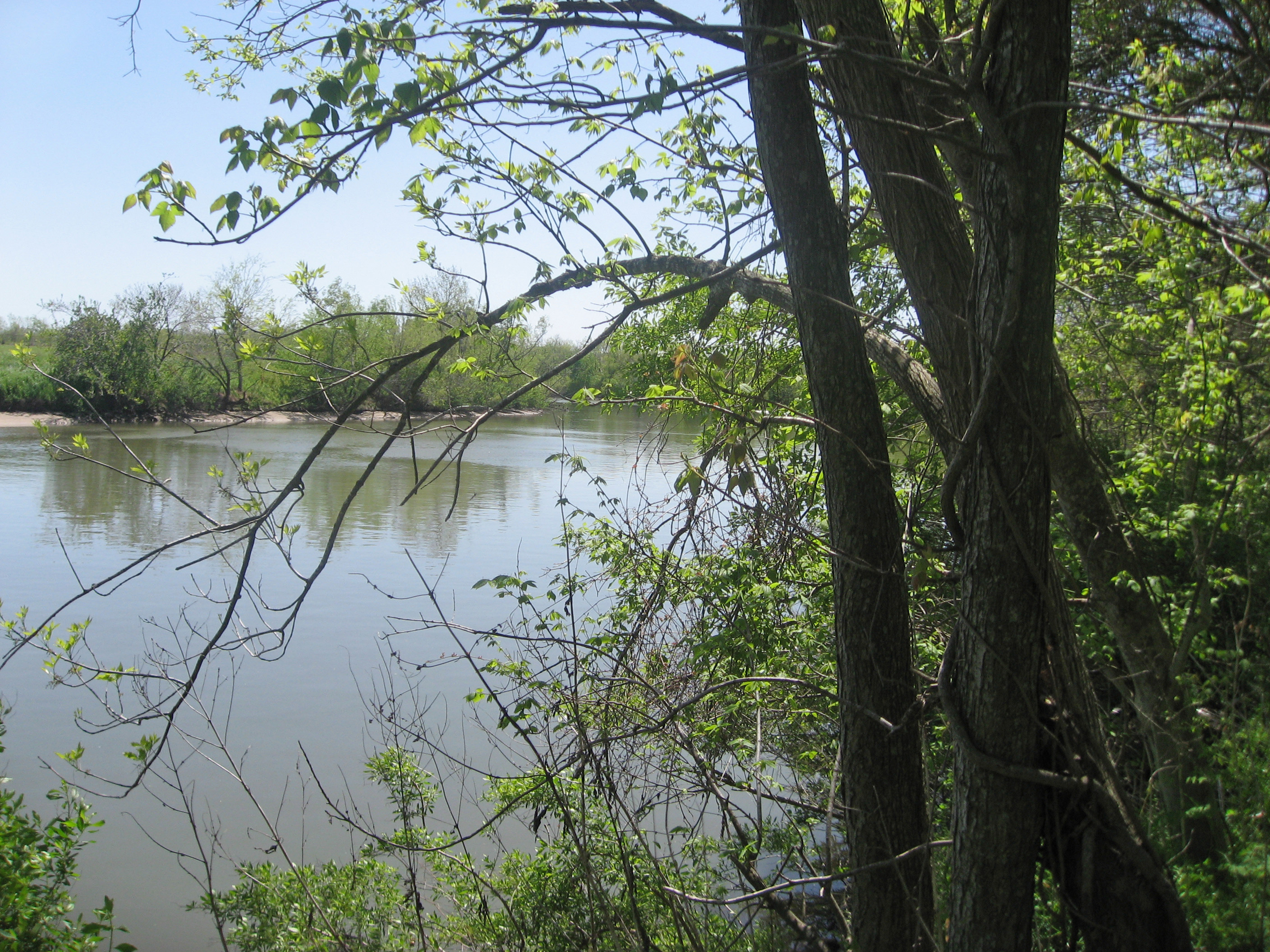
Sims Bayou, a tributary of Buffalo Bayou, as it passes Charles Milby Park

The upper watershed of Buffalo Bayou is impounded by the Addicks and Barker reservoirs, which comprise a major flood control system for the region. The reservoir system plays a crucial role in delaying and attenuating the peak outflow of the river during large rainfall events. Moving eastward, the Buffalo flows under State Highway 6 and into Terry Hershey Park, a linear park which follows the bayou for approximately 6 miles (9.7 km), culminating at Beltway 8.

The bayou meanders around the Memorial Villages between Beltway 8 and Loop 610. The banks along this reach are mostly private property, however there is a public access point and official Texas Parks and Wildlife paddling trail canoe launch at Briarbend Park, which is located in a quiet neighborhood south of San Felipe and west of Voss Road. There is another official canoe launch and access point just outside of 610 on Woodway. Additionally, it is legal to access the bayou at all public roadway bridges, but legal parking spots may not exist near these bridges.

On the east side of Loop 610, Buffalo Bayou passes along the south side of Memorial Park and the north side of River Oaks Country Club, and is accessible to the public along the entire Memorial Park frontage. Bayou Bend Collection and Gardens, the former estate of Houston philanthropist Ima Hogg, is located on the north bank of the bayou just east of Memorial Park. After passing under Shepherd Drive, the waterway enters Buffalo Bayou Park, which is bordered on the north by Memorial Drive and the south by Allen Parkway. The park continues for 2.3 miles (3.7 km) to Interstate 45, where it enters Downtown Houston. The bayou flows past Allen's Landing and joins White Oak Bayou before exiting the central business district at Interstate 69. The bayou widens considerably as it travels through the East End, culminating at the Houston Ship Channel.

== History ==
=== Early settlement ===
Along with Galveston Island and Galveston Bay itself, Buffalo Bayou was one of the focal points for early Anglo-American settlement in early Texas, first part of the Spanish Empire and then part of Mexico. Early communities began to appear at the beginning of the 19th century, including Lynchburg, Harrisburg, and Rightor's Point (modern Morgan's Point) in the 1820s. The bayou became important in Texas history when the final battle of the Texas Revolution was fought along its banks where it merges with the San Jacinto River.

In the 1830s, new communities such as Houston were established along the shoreline. A local entrepreneur named Samuel Allen (unrelated to the founders of Houston) established a large ranch, later known as the Allen Ranch, between Harrisburg and Galveston Bay. Docks at Harrisburg, Houston, and the Allen Ranch gradually became the foundations of what would become the modern Port of Houston. Harrisburg served as the region's major trade center until the 1870s, when a large fire destroyed its railroad facilities, which were subsequently rebuilt in Houston.

Houston's original docks, today known as Allen's Landing, were established at the foot of Main Street at the confluence of Buffalo Bayou and White Oak Bayou. The first wharves were opened in 1840, and the Port of Houston was established in 1841. This was the most westerly location a small trading schooner could turn around; without extensive dredging, only small vessels could access the city. This site is now a public park adjacent to the University of Houston–Downtown.

After the Civil War, which bolstered the local economy, dredging became a more viable option. The Bayou Ship Channel Company began major dredging operations in 1870, and the city began receiving federal aid to complete the project. This first dredging of the Buffalo Bayou was completed in 1876.

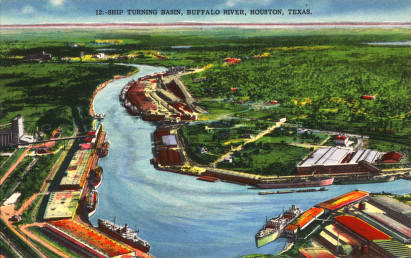
Postcard illustration of the Houston Ship Channel Turning Basin north of Magnolia Park, 1914–1924

By the mid-20th century, the Port of Houston had established itself as the leading port in Texas, eclipsing the natural harbors at Galveston and Texas City. The Turning Basin terminal in Harrisburg (now part of Houston) became the port's largest shipping point. The Texas oil boom of the early 20th century spurred further industrial development.

Extreme floods in the first half of the 20th century, especially in 1929 and 1935, devastated Downtown Houston and resulted in a number of federally-funded flood control projects in the upper reaches of the watershed. The Texas Legislature created the Harris County Flood Control District (HCFCD) in 1937, and by the end of the 1930s, over $35 million ($810 million in 2016 dollars) of federal, state, and county funds had been earmarked for an extensive drainage program. In then-rural western Harris County, the United States Army Corps of Engineers constructed Barker Reservoir, completed in 1945, and Addicks Reservoir, completed in 1948. Combined, these reservoirs provide 410,000 acre-feet (510 million cubic meters) of runoff storage, which has largely prevented downstream flood events. Six miles of Buffalo Bayou between present-day Highway 6 and Beltway 8 was channelized during the construction of the reservoirs. Later, between 1953 and 1958, the stretch between Shepherd Drive and Sabine Street west of Downtown was also straightened. The length of bayou between these two channelized sections, which largely runs through the Memorial Villages, has remained in its natural, meandering state.

=== Modern history and revitalization ===
In the 1960s, local resident and conservationist Terry Hershey, working with local congressman (and eventual President) George H.W. Bush, prevented the federal government from lining the straightened sections of the bayou with concrete. In 1966, Hershey and a number of other homeowners in the Memorial area formed the Buffalo Bayou Preservation Association, which later expanded its mission and became the Bayou Preservation Association. In 1989, Terry Hershey Park, which runs parallel to the bayou between Beltway 8 and Highway 6, was dedicated to her efforts. The bayou is one of the few bayous in Houston to retain its natural riparian ecosystem.

Following the passage of the Clean Water Act in 1972, Houston sought to address the untreated sewage that was being discharged into the bayous. The city has invested over $3 billion into new sewers, pumping stations, and sewage treatment plants across the metropolitan area, which has significantly improved water quality in the region.

In 1977, Barbours Cut Terminal was opened at Morgan's Point, shifting shipping traffic away from the Turning Basin.

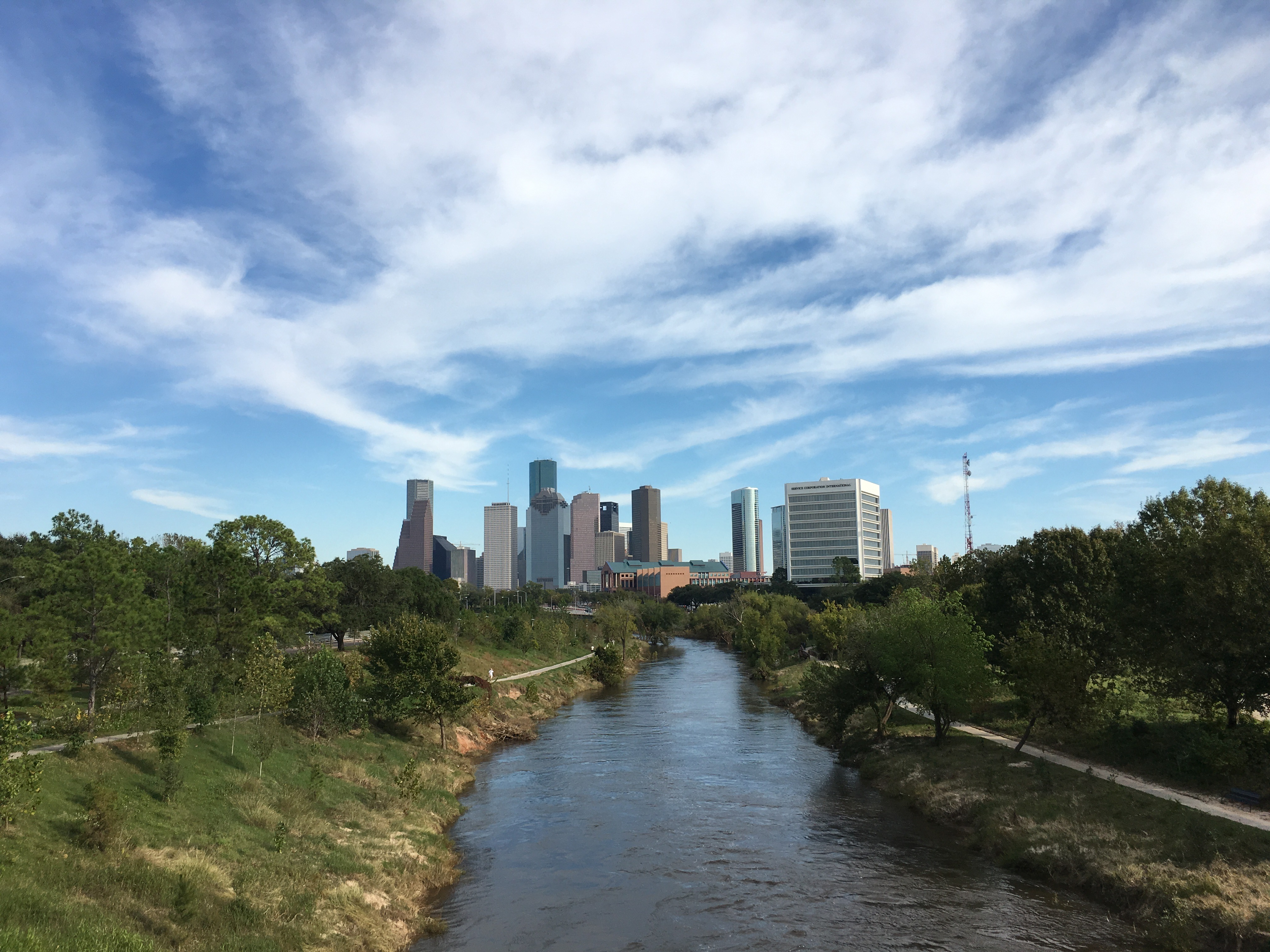
View of Buffalo Bayou looking east toward Downtown Houston from Rosemont Bridge in Buffalo Bayou Park

In 1986, the Buffalo Bayou Partnership, a nonprofit organization, was founded to leverage public and private financing towards renovating and expanding park space along the river. The Partnership's 2002 Buffalo Bayou Master Plan established a 20-year, $5.6 billion vision for the bayou centered on a series of linear parks through central Houston. The project goals include the rehabilitation of formerly industrial land, habitat restoration, canoeing and kayaking facilities, hike-and-bike trails, cultural programming, flood control management, and mixed-use urban development.

The Partnership has leveraged over $150 million to implement these projects. The Buffalo Bayou Promenade, opened in 2006, is a 23-acre (9.3-hectare) recreation area with 1.4 miles (2.3 km) of hiking and biking trails extending from Sabine Street west of Downtown to Bagby Street in the Theater District. In 2015, the Partnership completed Buffalo Bayou Park immediately to the west of the Promenade, adding another 160 acres (65 hectares) of renovated parkland along a 2.3-mile (3.7 km) stretch. Buffalo Bayou Park, labeled a "signature, verdant downtown gateway" by the Houston Chronicle, includes a dog park, broad lawns, gardens, restaurants, and an art space inside a historic disused cistern. In 2006 the Houston Cistern, managed by the Buffalo Bayou Partnership, started offering historical tours and immersive art exhibits.

In August 2017, extensive rainfall from Hurricane Harvey brought the bayou to record high levels, shattering previous flood crests by several feet. Addicks and Barker reservoirs were filled to capacity, forcing the U.S. Army Corps of Engineers to initiate controlled releases of 16,000 cubic feet per second (450 m^{3}/s) to prevent catastrophic uncontrolled releases and protect the structural integrity of the dams. Despite these efforts, uncontrolled releases did occur around the spillway at the northern end of Addicks Reservoir for the first time in the structure's history.

The reservoir releases caused extensive flooding of neighborhoods and roadways along the western stretch of Buffalo Bayou between Barker Reservoir and Downtown; the Memorial area was heavily damaged. The bayou was projected to remain at a major flood stage for up to two weeks after the storm in order to drain the reservoirs as much as possible.

In 2024, the U.S. Department of Transportation's Federal Highway Administration announced a $26.5 million grant to be used across the country to rebuild bridges, including a $2 million grant to be spent on rebuilding eight bridges in Buffalo Bayou that were destroyed in Hurricane Harvey. Additionally, a study would be held that would focus on analyzing how these bridges should be built and where they should be built to be the most effective.

== Role of the watershed ==
=== Flood control ===
The Buffalo Bayou watershed is central to the drainage of Houston and Harris County. Lying over relatively impervious soils and very flat topography, the bayou has extensive natural floodplains, as do most Gulf coastal rivers and streams. Urbanization of the watershed has placed thousands of people in vulnerable areas and has affected the frequency and intensity of flood events.

In response to the disastrous flood of 1935, the U.S. Army Corps of Engineers, in association with the Harris County Flood Control District, began an extensive program of reservoir construction, removal of stream-bank vegetation, and channelization to reduce Houston's flooding risk. The two most prominent flood control features in the Buffalo Bayou watershed are the Addicks and Barker reservoirs in western Harris County, which provide a combined 26,000 acres (11,000 hectares) of open land for runoff storage. In recent years, extensive suburban development upstream of the reservoirs has stressed this flood control infrastructure.

Since 2015, Buffalo Bayou has experienced four major flooding events, including the Memorial Day Flood on May 26, 2015, the Tax Day Flood of 2016, Hurricane Harvey in 2017, and Tropical Storm Imelda in 2019.

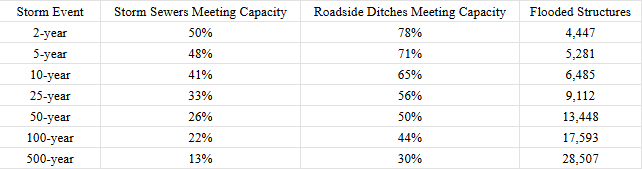
Chart created using data from a Houston Public Works study.

In 2024 Gauge Engineering published a report of the Buffalo Bayou watershed. They created models and collected data, finding that the flooding before West Sam Houston Tollway was due to the floodplain, while the flooding after West Sam Houston Tollway was contributed to by sewage infrastructure.

=== Recreation and wildlife ===
Buffalo Bayou is home to numerous urban parks, including George Bush Park (located entirely within Barker Reservoir), Terry Hershey Park, Memorial Park, Buffalo Bayou Park, and Tony Marron Park in the East End. San Jacinto Battleground State Historic Site, the site of the Battle of San Jacinto which ended the Texas Revolution, includes the USS Texas, a museum ship permanently moored near the mouth of the bayou.

The bayou supports a significant population of catfish, sunfish, gars, and bass for recreational fishing. It includes a population of birds and hosts the popular Waugh Bat Bridge. Snakes and alligators have also been spotted along the bayou.

==== Navigation ====
Buffalo Bayou is legally navigable by paddle craft from its source in Katy to the western end of the Ship Channel upstream of Wayside Drive. A majority of paddle trips generally take place between Highway 6 and Shepherd Drive section, with main focus on the section from Briarbend Park to Woodway and to Downtown Houston, generally because of ease of access and length of the trail.

The section from Highway 6 to Beltway 8 is known for downed trees, which require frequent portages. The section from Beltway 8 to Briarbend Park is generally kept clear of blockages by the Harris County Flood Control District; however, there are several gravel bar hazards to negotiate during normal water flows. The section from Briarbend Park to Woodway is similarly kept clear, although there may be trees across the waterway immediately after storms.

=== Water quality ===
As an urban waterway, Buffalo Bayou is especially vulnerable to low water quality. The condition of the bayou's waters has long been a topic of concern in Houston. During the 19th century, the river essentially functioned as both an open sanitary sewer and a source of drinking water. Industrial and agricultural discharge into the water was a common practice, and the bayou took on a reputation as a "cesspool" with an "unbearable stench." It was not until the early 20th century that the city had the resources to construct sewerage and sewage treatment plants. However, environmental progress was slow, and Buffalo Bayou was still heavily polluted through the late 1940s.

Today, the bayou still faces significant environmental challenges, including elevated levels of indicator bacteria, low oxygen saturation, and heavy nutrient pollution.

In February 2019, it was reported that 64,000 gallons of jet fuel leaked into the bayou via the nearby Hobby Airport.

Efforts are continually made by the Buffalo Bayou Partnership to keep the water clean, with the group being responsible for the removal of more than 2,000 cubic yards of garbage in 2024 and more than 2,200 cubic yards of garbage in 2025.

== Image gallery ==
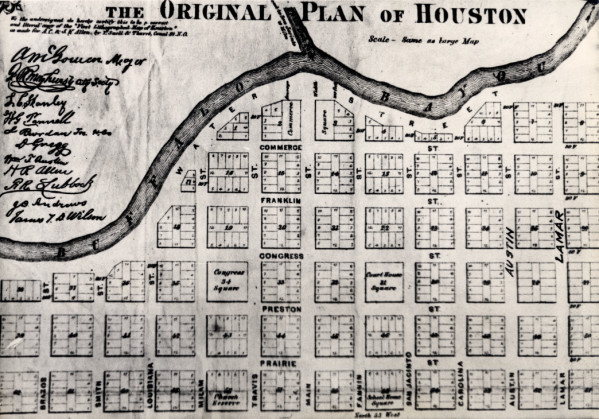
The "Original Plan of Houston" shows a city hugging Buffalo Bayou with space reserved for a courthouse, churches, and schools. (1869)

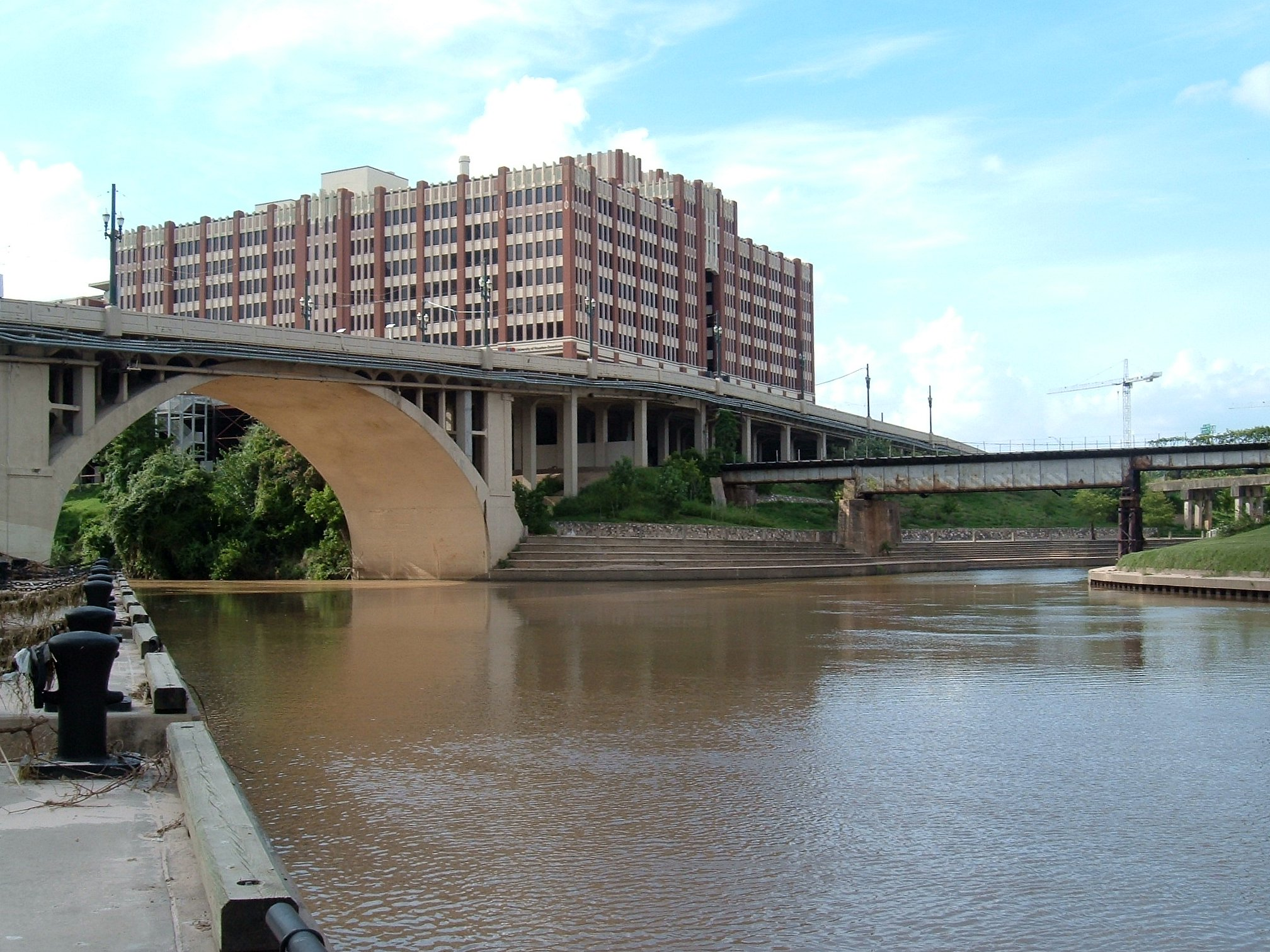
Merger of Buffalo Bayou and White Oak Bayou at Allen's Landing

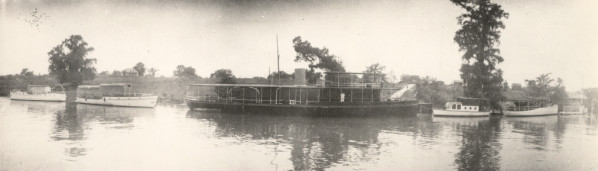
Boats in Buffalo Bayou in 1910

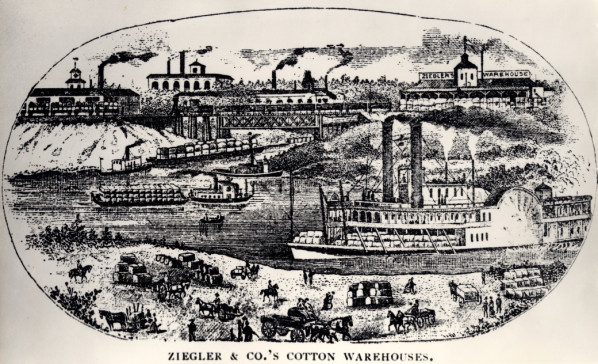
Postcard Illustration of Allen's Landing (1910)

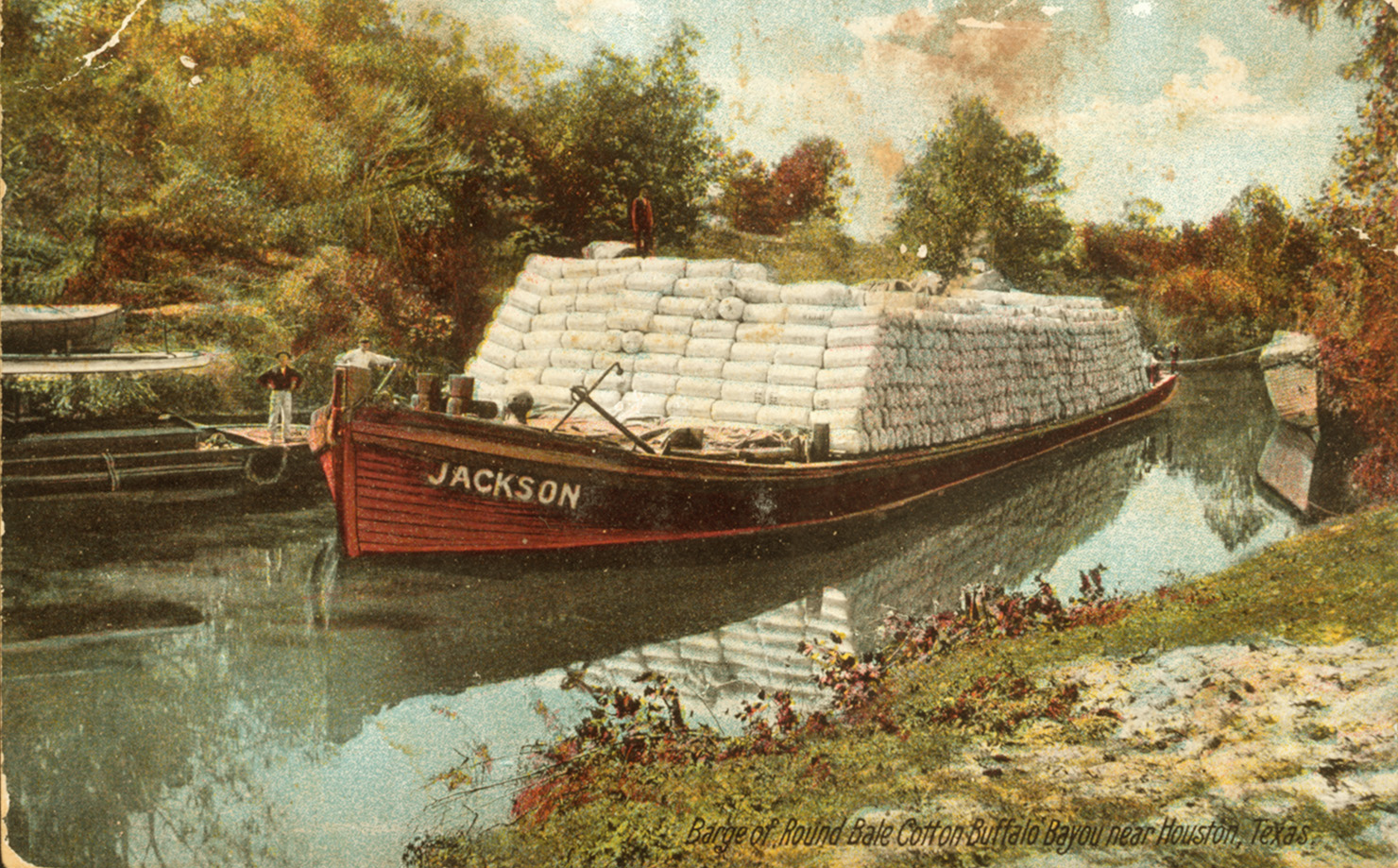
Cotton barge on Buffalo Bayou (postcard, 1908)

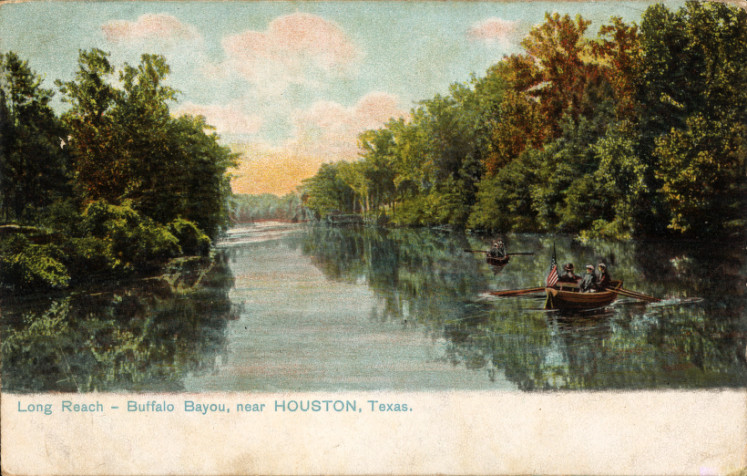
Long Reach, Buffalo Bayou, Houston, Texas (postcard, c. 1908)

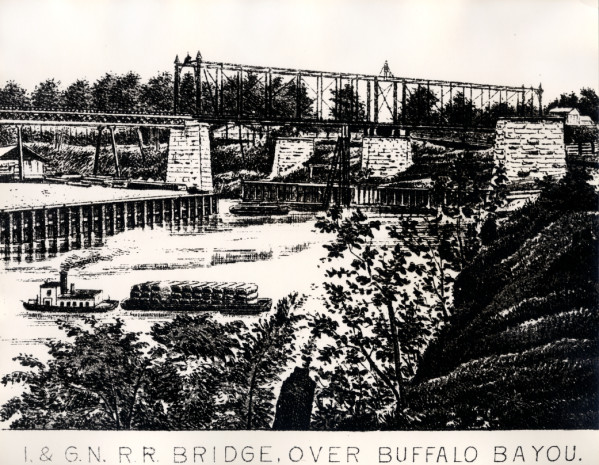
International and Great Northern Railroad bridge over Buffalo Bayou

== See also ==
- Houston Ship Channel
- Port of Houston
- San Jacinto River
- List of rivers of Texas
