= Terry Hershey Park =

County park in Houston, Texas, U.S.

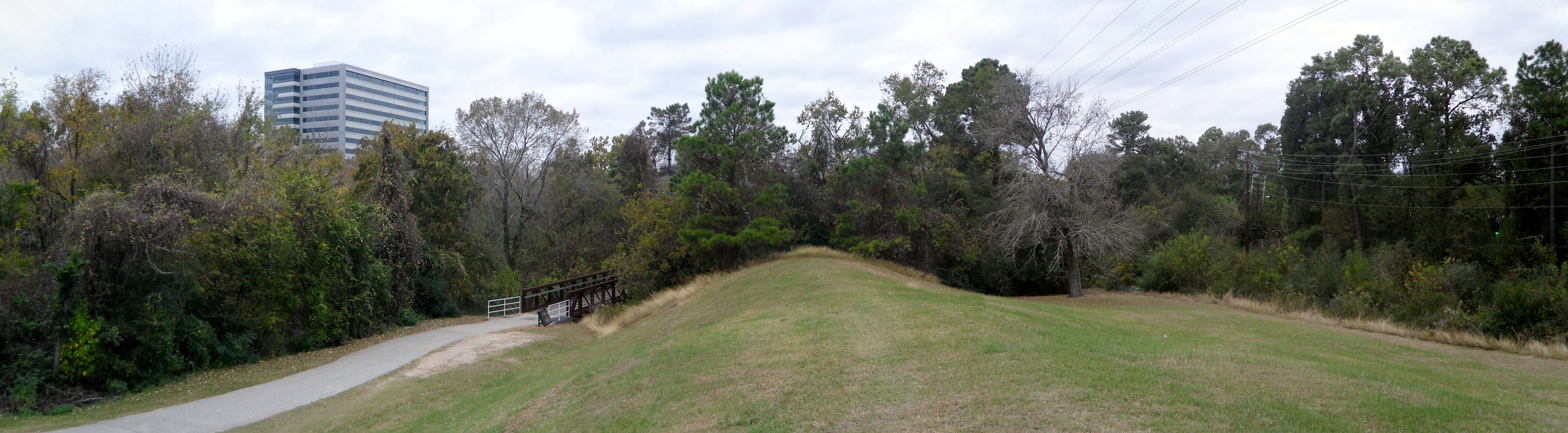
- A panoramic photo of Terry Hershey Park near Eldridge Road. The Buffalo Bayou is behind the trees at left.
- Interactive map of Terry Hershey Park
- Type: Public park (county park), bicycle trail
- Location: Houston, Texas
- Coordinates: 29.767078°N 95.618906°W
- Area: 496 acres (201 ha)
- Created: 1989; 37 years ago
- Operator: Harris County (Precinct Three, Commissioner Tom S. Ramsey, P.E.)
- Website: Terry Hershey Park at the Harris County Precinct Three website

Terry Hershey Park is a county park that runs parallel to a roughly 6-mile (9.7 km) stretch of the Buffalo Bayou in western Houston, Texas. The park is named after Terry Hershey, a conservationist who campaigned to keep the banks of Buffalo Bayou from being paved. The park hosts a network of trails that run along the bayou from State Highway 6 to the Sam Houston Tollway and is a popular destination for local residents, runners, bicyclists and Geocachers.

== Bike trails ==
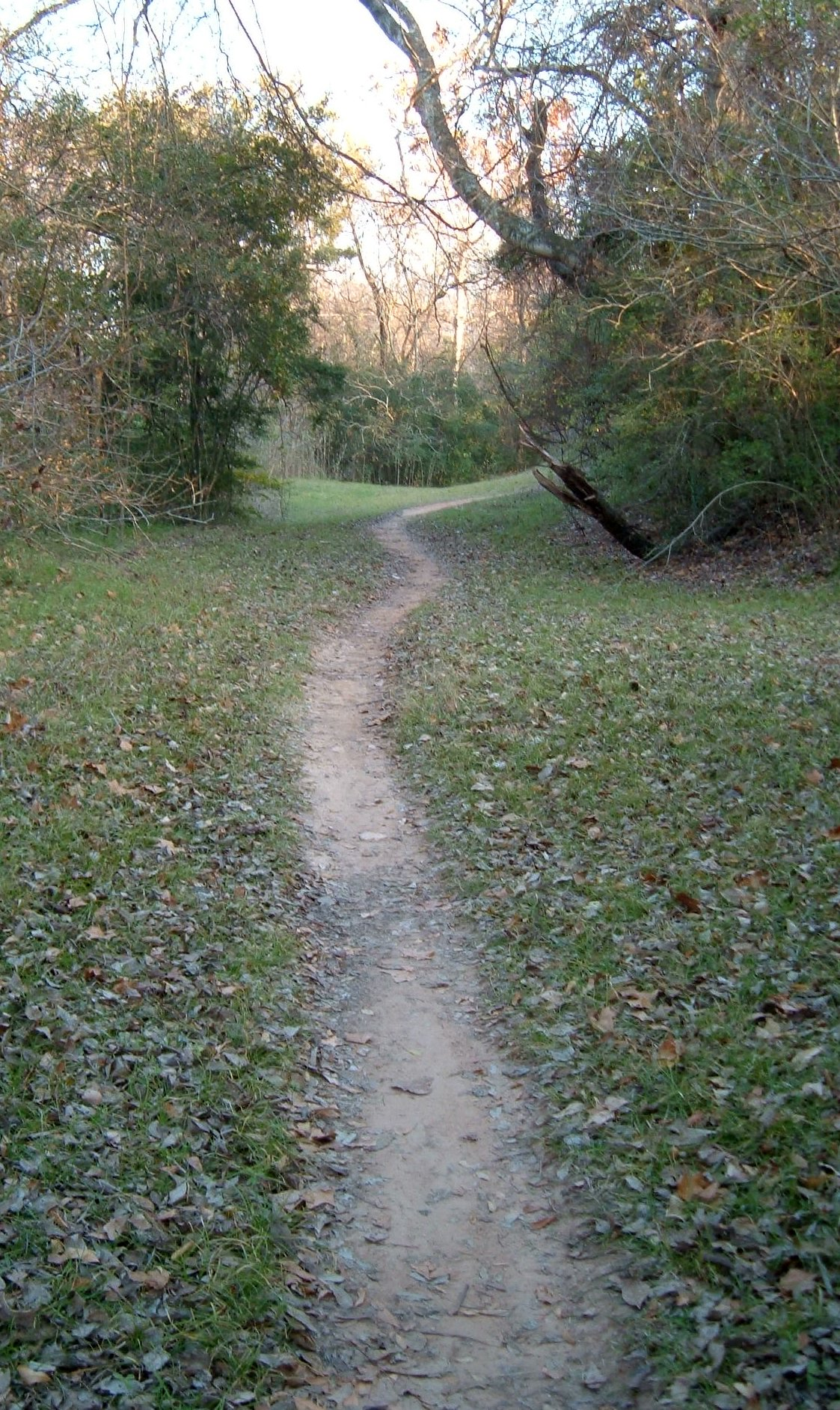
A trail along the bayou.

The park maintains a network of both paved asphalt paths and dirt trails along the bayou. The paved walkways are located in the cleared stretch of the park, free of trees, and are about 10 feet in width. The dirt trails, however, cut through the densely grown forest growing along the bayou, and are not easily accessible.

As of August 2020, e-bikes and other electric/battery powered transportation are prohibited on the trails. Per State Law, Texas Transportation Code Sec. 551.106(a), e-bike prohibition is only valid on dirt trails. E-bike is still allowed on paved trails where operation of non-electric bicycles is permitted.

The park promotes its signature bike trails, the "Anthills", on its website.

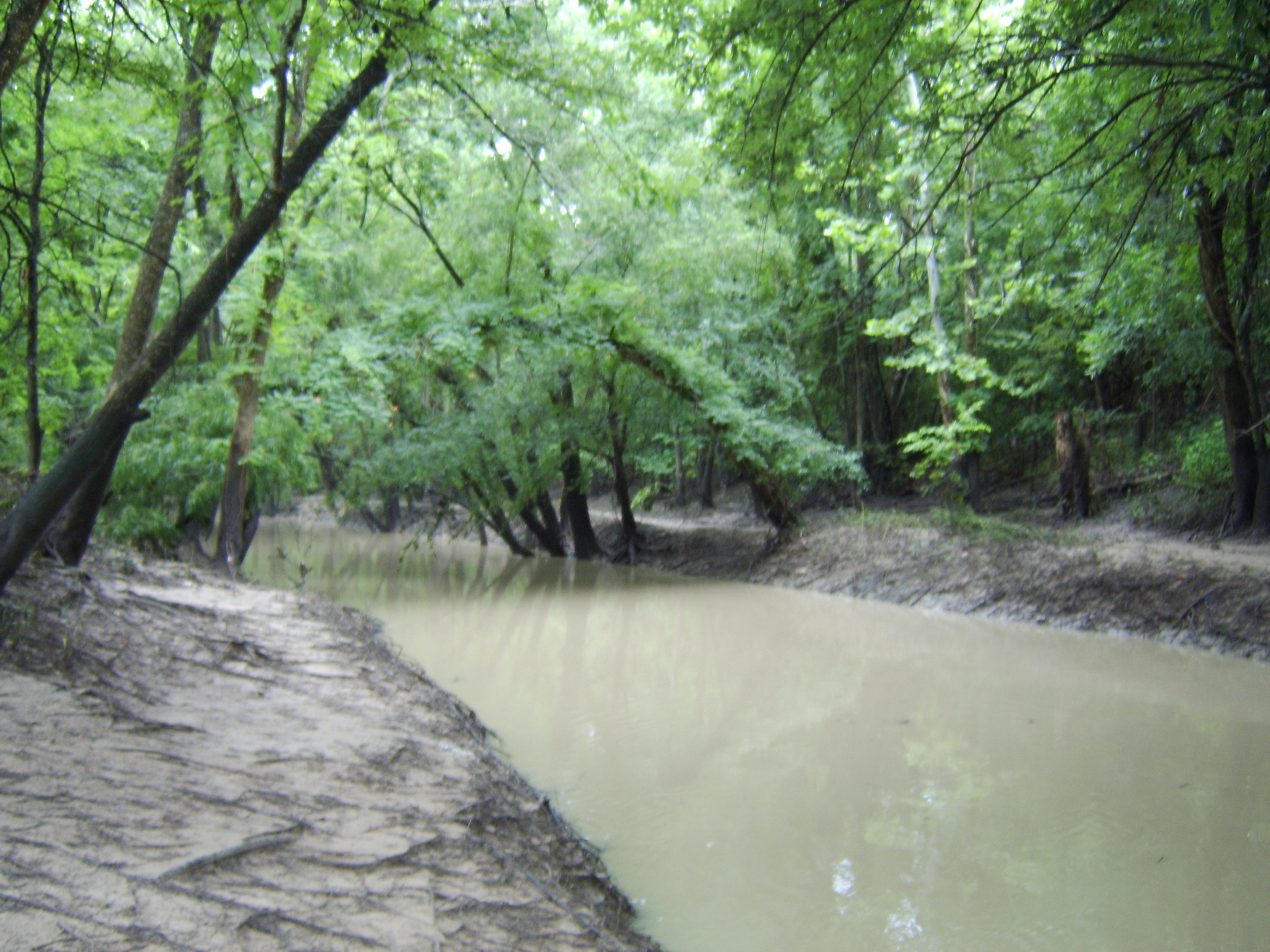
A branchoff bayou in the park.

== Neighborhoods along the park ==
Neighborhoods are listed from east to west.

Bordering the park to the north:

- Memorial Bend
- Memorial Glen
- Gaywood
- Memorial Trails
- Wilchester
- Wilchester West
- Yorkshire
- Woodbend in Memorial
- River Forest
- Memorial Drive Acres
- Nottingham Forest
- Ashford Forest
- Westchester
- Olympus at Memorial Apartments
- Turkey Creek Townhomes
- Meadows on Memorial
- Thornwood
- Promenade Memorial
- Village on Memorial Townhomes
- Memorial Thicket
- Marywood
- Oaks of Fleetwood Townhomes
- Fleetwood

Bordering the park to the south:

- Country Village
- Briargrove Park
- Creekstone Apartments
- Walnut Bend
- Lakewood Forest
- Lakeside Place Apartments
- Epernay
- Woods of Lakeside
- Heathwood
- Ashford Forest
- Ashford Lakes Apartments
- Wildwood Cluster Homes
- Shepherd Trace
- Provident Oaks
- Lake at Stonehenge
- Briarforest
- Parkway Village
- Oaks of Parkway
- Briar Hills
