= Barker Reservoir =

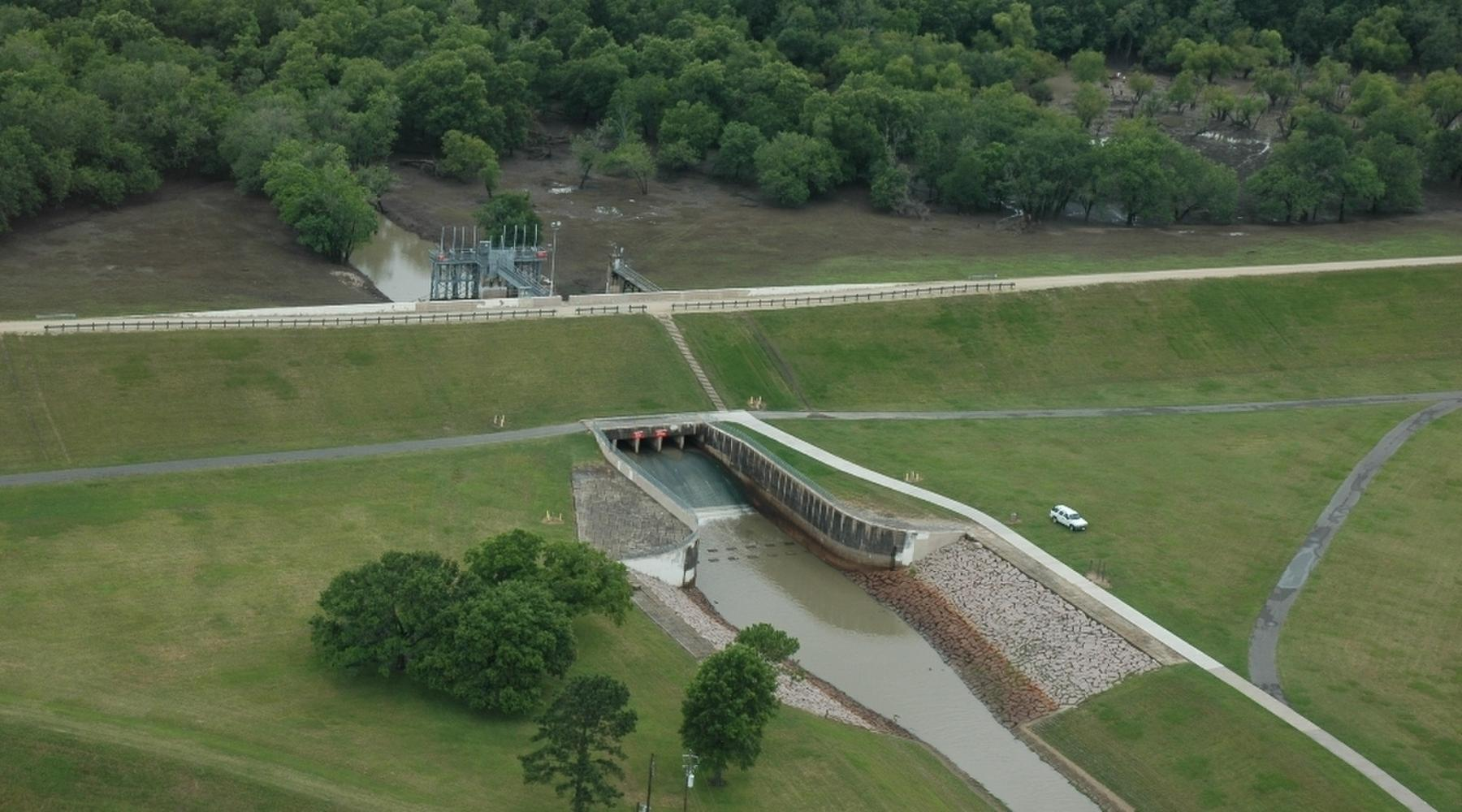

- Location within Texas Location within the United States
- Location: Houston, Texas, United States
- Coordinates: 29.769674°N 95.646335°W
- Type: Reservoir
- Basin countries: United States

Barker Reservoir is a flood control structure in Houston, Texas which prevents downstream flooding of Buffalo Bayou, the city's principal river. The reservoir operates in conjunction with Addicks Reservoir to the northeast, which impounds Mayde and Bear Creeks, two tributaries of the Buffalo. Both reservoirs were authorized under the Rivers and Harbors Act of June 20, 1938, which were modified by the Flood Control Acts of August 11, 1938; September 3, 1954; and October 27, 1965.

George Bush Park, operated by Harris County, is located entirely within the reservoir.

Houston annexed the Addicks area in 1972.

== Location ==
Barker Reservoir is southwest of the intersection of Interstate 10 and State Highway 6, about one mile (1.6 km) south of Addicks in western Harris County.

The Barker Reservoir spillway is located at 29°46′10.86″N 95°38′47.09″W.

The Barker Dam and Reservoir is named for the community of Barker, Texas. In 1895, the Missouri, Kansas, and Texas Railroad laid tracks and began operating through Barker. The town was named for the track laying contractor Ed. Barker.

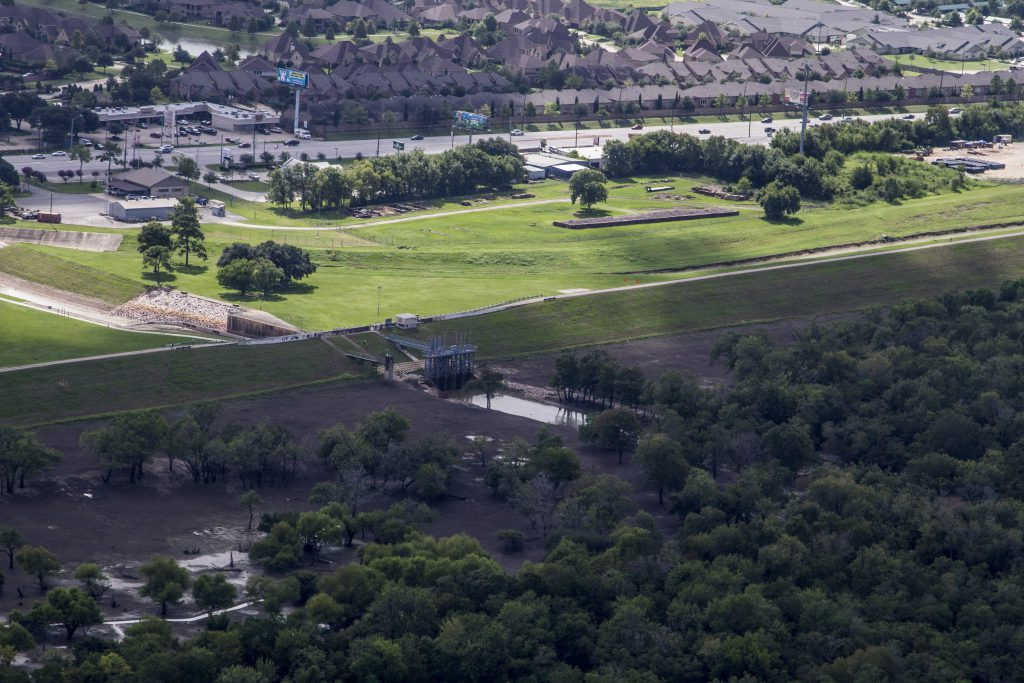
Aerial view of the Barker Reservoir spillway in 2016, looking southeast.

== Construction ==
Barker Reservoir is formed by a rolled earthen dam 72,900 feet (22,200 m) long. A 12-foot-wide (3.7 m) gravel road extends along the top of the dam. The top of the dam has a maximum elevation of 112.5 feet (34.3 m) above the N.G.V.D. and is 36 feet high in places. The maximum storage capacity of the reservoir is 209,000 acre-feet (258,000,000 cubic metres; 258 gigalitres), Combined with the adjacent Addicks Reservoir to the northeast, the total storage capacity is about 410,000 acre-feet (510,000,000 m^{3}; 510 GL).

From 2008 to 2014, the U.S. Army Corps of Engineers Galveston District implemented $4.4 million in interim risk reduction measures (at Addicks and Barker dams) to address deficiencies until long-term solutions could be identified and executed. In 2014, staff completed a Dam Safety Modification Study to evaluate long-term repairs and address issues associated with the dams. Staff presented this information during a public meeting October 29 at Bear Creek Community Center in Houston to discuss these plans and gather feedback. Construction is scheduled to begin May 2015 with an estimated completion date of 2019.

== Benefits ==
It is estimated the Addicks and Barker Reservoirs, along with other federal construction projects on Lower Buffalo Bayou and its tributaries, will prevent average annual flood damages of $16,372,000 to the city of Houston. Addicks and Barker provide no flood reduction benefits to properties upstream of the dams and reservoirs.

== Government-Induced Flooding and Ensuing Litigation ==
During and after Hurricane Harvey, 7,000 acres of private upstream land was deliberately submerged by the U.S. Army Corps of Engineers operation of the Addicks and Barker dams and reservoirs. In response, upstream property owners filed a series of lawsuits in The U.S. Court of Federal Claims (CFC) seeking to hold the U.S. government liable for the induced flooding under the “takings clause” of the Fifth Amendment.

Given the large number of lawsuits, the CFC decided to handle the cases as a group by using case management methods commonly employed in multi-district litigation. To that end, and after considering hundreds of applications, the CFC appointed attorneys Armistead "Armi" Easterby, Daniel Charest, and Charles Irvine to serve as Co-Lead trial counsel for upstream plaintiffs. The CFC also selected 13 property owners for a bellwether trial to determine causation and liability issues common to the Upstream property owners.

Federal Claims Judge Charles Lettow presided over the May 2019 liability trial, which was held in Houston, Texas. On December 17, 2019, the CFC held that the upstream flooding constituted a Fifth Amendment taking. The decision detailed how U.S. government officials knowingly and intentionally imposed flooding on upstream private property, and that the victims living near the federally owned reservoirs did not know their property was in a federal flood-control project's reservoir flood pool. During trial, government lawyers stated this litigation is the largest Fifth Amendment “takings” case in United States history.

In June 2022, Judge Lettow presided over a 2-week trial addressing the amounts owed to 6 bellwether plaintiffs by the United States under the Fifth Amendment's takings clause. In October 2022, the CFC issued its just compensation decision finding in favor of the bellwether plaintiffs. The 6 bellwether plaintiffs received awards for decreased real property values, damaged or destroyed personal property, and costs for the owners being displaced. Total compensation for the ~10,000 upstream property owners who suffered government-induced flooding could reach or exceed $1.7 billion before interest. The 6-year statute of limitations for filing a lawsuit in the CFC is set to expire in August 2023.

== Buffalo Bayou & Tributaries Resiliency Study Interim Report ==
In October 2020, the U.S. Army Corps of Engineers published an Interim Report regarding the Addicks and Barker dams and reservoirs. The Interim Report states that high reservoir water levels resulting from the Army Corp's operation of the Addicks and Barker dams "pose unacceptable risks to health and human safety, private property, and public infrastructure," and that "future economic damages from flooding are likely" in the upstream area. The Interim Report further indicates that there is inadequate government-owned real estate for dam operations, as more than 20,000 homes and 24,000 parcels of privately owned upstream land are within the areas subject to government-induced flooding. The total acquisition cost to acquire these lands would be approximately $10 billion.
