= Rice Military, Houston =

Neighborhood of Houston, Texas

Coordinates: 29.767°N 95.416°W

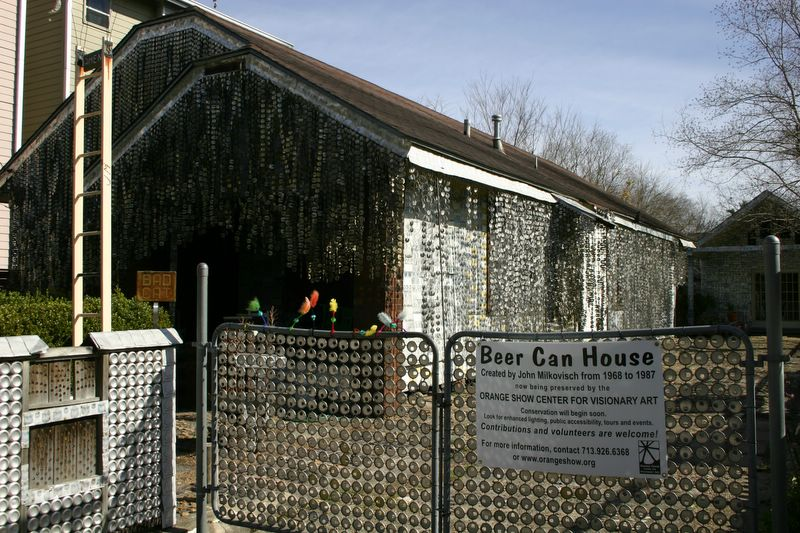
Beer Can House

Rice Military is a neighborhood in Houston, Texas, United States. The Beer Can House is located in Rice Military.

== History ==
The name originates from nearby Camp Logan, a World War I-era U.S. Army training camp, which was replaced by Memorial Park after the war. The “Rice” in Rice Military comes from the family that used to own the area. One of the most popular of the Rices, William Marsh Rice, left behind a fortune to found Rice University. Bankers Trust Co. paid $54,425 ($999,200 in current money) to the Rice family and another party for the entire area that would become Rice Military."

Betty L. Martin of the Houston Chronicle said in 2008 that Rice Military was a "once-rural community built more than 80 years ago that featured neighborhood stores and blue-collar bungalows on tree-lined streets."

Around the 1990s artists began arriving in the area and caused it to change. By 2003 many young professionals moved to Rice Military to be in proximity to restaurants, theaters, and Memorial Park. During that year, Tim Bammel, a real estate agent working for Martha Turner Properties quoted in the Houston Chronicle, said that Rice Military became "a real urban center." In 2003 the community was trying to build a roundabout at Washington Avenue and Westcott Street; that roundabout would link Rice Military with Downtown Houston. In 2008 Martin said that due to the large amount of development, the neighborhood was "nearly at capacity", forcing developers to begin developing surrounding subdivisions. Around that period residents of Rice Military campaigned to have a grocery store built in an area between Interstate 10 (Katy Freeway) and Washington Avenue.

In 2022 the city government declared a block of eight houses as a historic district named Brunner-Harmonium Historic District. The houses, most of which were constructed between 1905 and 1915, are on or around Blossom Street.

== Cityscape ==
The community is in proximity to Memorial Park and River Oaks. David Walter, a Rice Military resident quoted in the Houston Chronicle, said that one could travel to Downtown Houston from Rice Military in five minutes. The boundaries of the Rice Military neighborhood are Washington Ave on the north, the Buffalo Bayou on the south, Shepherd Drive on the east, and Westcott Street on the west.

As of 2008 Rice Military proper had 391 houses. Karen Derr, the owner of the real estate firm Karen Derr & Associates, said that many area realtors also associate houses in neighboring subdivisions and label them as being in "Rice Military". The Rice Military Neighborhood area has around 2250 houses.

The original Rice Military houses consisted of small bungalow houses and shotgun houses. Because of a lack of restrictions against types of houses that one could construct, various housing styles emerged in Rice Military. In 2003 houses included single-family houses, two- and three-story townhouses, and condominiums.

Katherine Feser of the Chronicle said in 2003 that Rice Military became an "eclectic mix" and "a mishmash." During that year, Feser said that the range of house prices in Rice Military was "all over the map." Tim Bammel, a real estate agent of Martha Turner Properties, said in 2003 that a Rice Military "tear-down", or a house to be purchased so it could be demolished and replaced with new housing, had a price of around $150,000 ($262,500 in current money). He said that a three-story townhouse would cost from $300,000 ($525,100 in current money) to $340,000 ($595,100 in current money). In 2012 Linda Jamail Marshall of Linda Marshall Realtors Inc. said that townhouses were a relatively recent addition to Rice Military and that the oldest townhouses are around were five to ten years old.

As of 2003 some portions of Rice Military have narrow streets and open drainage ditches. Feser said that these conditions "provide contrast" to newly built expensive houses located on those streets.

== Government ==
Harris Health System (formerly Harris County Hospital District) designated Casa de Amigos Health Center in the Near Northside for ZIP code 77007. The nearest public hospital is Ben Taub General Hospital in the Texas Medical Center.

=== Federal and state representation ===
Rice Military is in Texas's 7th congressional district.

The neighborhood is within the Houston Police Department's Central Patrol Division. The Durham Storefront serves the community.

== Economy ==
In 1999, the Drypers Corporation was headquartered on the 9th floor of the 5300 Memorial Drive building.

== Education ==
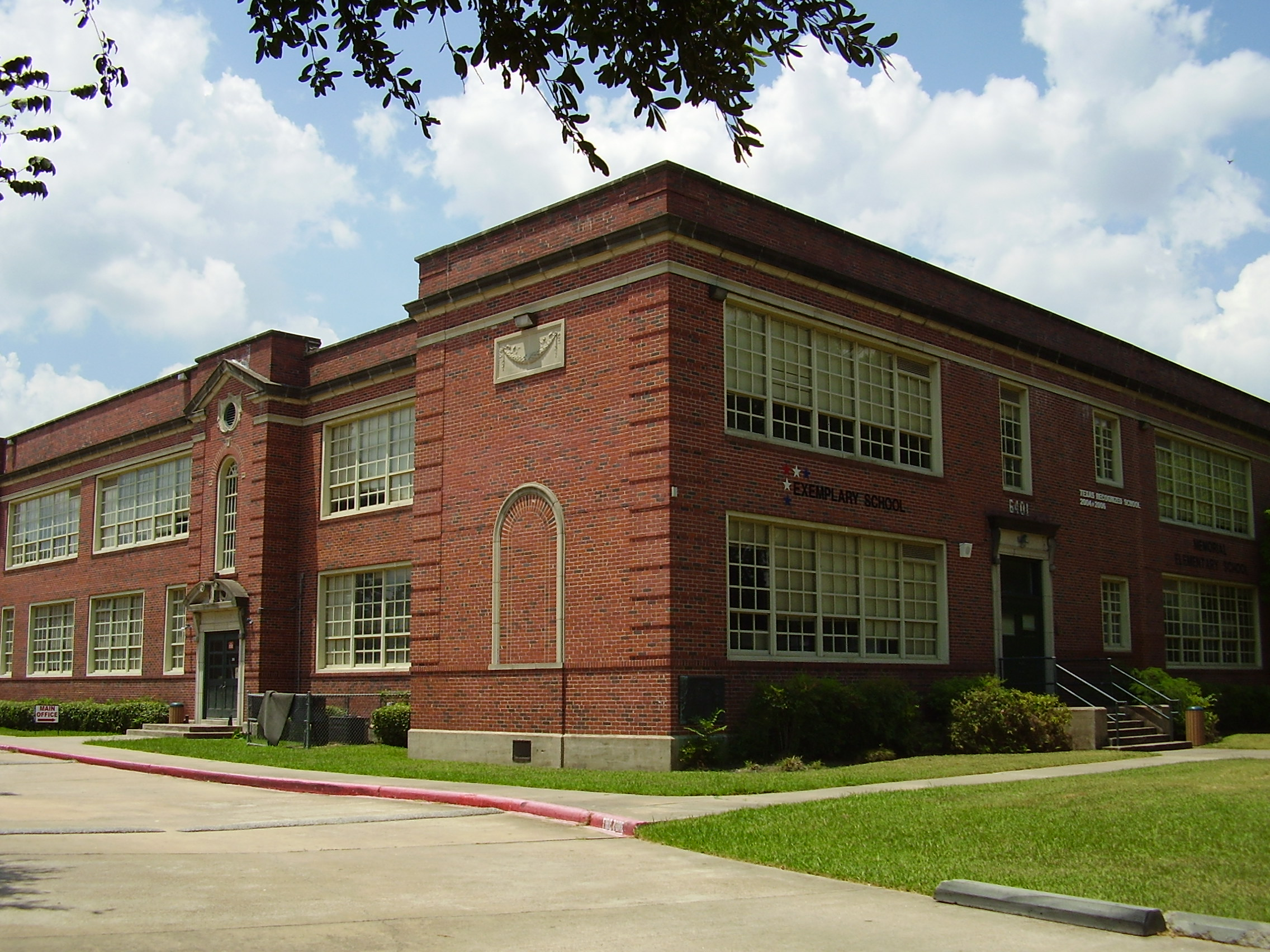
Memorial Elementary School

Residents are zoned to the following Houston ISD schools:

- Memorial Elementary School
- Hogg Middle School
- Lamar High School

Portions of Rice Military were formerly zoned to Milam Elementary School. It opened as Brunner High School, a part of the Brunner Independent School District, in 1912. Brunner ISD merged into Houston schools in 1913-1914 and it was converted into a grade 1-9 school, West End Junior High School. It was renamed to Ben Milam Elementary after junior high grades were moved to George Washington Junior High School in September 1926. In December 1977 the building closed as it had received significant damage; a replacement campus opened in August 1980. From 1977 to 1980 students attended school at Doris Miller. In April 2004 the HISD board voted to close Milam, rezoning its students to Memorial. As of 2007 Milam was being used as office space for the HISD administration. By 2011 Milam was converted into a private preschool.

St. Theresa School, a Roman Catholic K-8 School that is a part of the Archdiocese of Galveston-Houston, is in the area.

== Parks and recreation ==
Nellie Keyes Park is located in Rice Military. It has a playground and a trail system.

== See also ==
- Cottage Grove, Houston
- Crestwood/Glen Cove, Houston
