= List of people executed in the United States in 1918 =

Ninety-nine people, all male, were executed in the United States in 1918, fifty-two by electrocution, forty-six by hanging, and one by firing squad.

== List of people executed in the United States in 1918 ==
No.	Date of execution	Name	Age of person			Gender	Ethnicity	State	Method	Ref.
No.	Date of execution	Name	At execution	At offense	Age difference	Gender	Ethnicity	State	Method	Ref.
1	January 11, 1918	Samuel Gangas	24	23	1	Male	White	Delaware	Hanging	
2	January 14, 1918	Frank Fisher	31	30	1	Male	White	Montana	Hanging	
3	January 14, 1918	John O'Neill	24	23	1	Male	White	Montana	Hanging	
4	January 14, 1918	Sherman A. Powell	29	Unknown	Unknown	Male	Black	Montana	Hanging	
5	January 15, 1918	Frederick Lincoln Small	51	50	1	Male	White	New Hampshire	Hanging	
6	January 25, 1918	John Gardner	23	Unknown	Unknown	Male	Black	South Carolina	Electrocution	
7	February 1, 1918	Charles Burnetti	35	34	1	Male	White	Ohio	Electrocution	
8	February 9, 1918	Giovanni Iraca	34	Unknown	Unknown	Male	White	New Jersey	Electrocution	
9	February 15, 1918	Harry F. Lindrum	22	Unknown	Unknown	Male	White	Illinois	Hanging	
10	February 15, 1918	Edward T. Wheed	Unknown	Unknown	1	Male	White	Illinois	Hanging	
11	March 1, 1918	Henry Hamilton	Unknown	Unknown	Unknown	Male	White	Louisiana	Hanging	
12	March 15, 1918	Walter Campbell	Unknown	Unknown	0	Male	Black	Louisiana	Hanging	
13	March 15, 1918	James Rudolph Enterkin	34	33	1	Male	White	Louisiana	Hanging	
14	March 15, 1918	Earl Neville	24	23	1	Male	Black	North Carolina	Electrocution	
15	April 5, 1918	John B. Mann	21	0	0	Male	Black	U.S. military	Hanging	
16	April 5, 1918	Walter Matthews	Unknown	0	0	Male	Black	U.S. military	Hanging	
17	April 8, 1918	Mike Uptic	36	35	1	Male	White	Pennsylvania	Electrocution	
18	April 9, 1918	Thomas Conway	32	Unknown	Unknown	Male	White	New Jersey	Electrocution	
19	April 11, 1918	Julian Romero	Unknown	Unknown	Unknown	Male	Hispanic	New Mexico	Hanging	
20	April 12, 1918	Juan Cuellae	30	29	1	Male	Hispanic	Montana	Hanging	
21	April 15, 1918	Samuel Edwards	30	29	1	Male	Black	Pennsylvania	Electrocution	
22	April 26, 1918	Willie Williams	20	19	1	Male	Black	North Carolina	Electrocution	
23	May 3, 1918	John Henry Prather	26	25	1	Male	Black	Oklahoma	Electrocution	
24	May 10, 1918	William Furgerson	18	Unknown	Unknown	Male	Black	South Carolina	Electrocution	
25	May 20, 1918	William Karl Warren	20	19	1	Male	Black	Pennsylvania	Electrocution	
26	May 23, 1918	John Kushmieruk	20	18	2	Male	White	New York	Electrocution	
27	May 24, 1918	Frank Moore	21	20	1	Male	Black	North Carolina	Electrocution	
28	May 24, 1918	Leonard Alexander Dodd	31	30	1	Male	White	Texas	Hanging	
29	May 24, 1918	Walter Robert Stevenson	34	33	1	Male	White	Texas	Hanging	
30	May 24, 1918	Howard Thomas Henry DeWeese	32	30	2	Male	White	Utah	Firing squad	
31	May 25, 1918	Herbert Perry	34	33	1	Male	Black	North Carolina	Electrocution	
32	May 27, 1918	Illio Obric	34	32	2	Male	White	Pennsylvania	Electrocution	
33	May 27, 1918	Giuseppi Polito	31	Unknown	Unknown	Male	White	Pennsylvania	Electrocution	
34	June 7, 1918	Lonnie Council	38	Unknown	Unknown	Male	Black	North Carolina	Electrocution	
35	June 7, 1918	Paul Langhorne	39	Unknown	Unknown	Male	Black	Virginia	Electrocution	
36	June 10, 1918	John Offutt Christley	45	43	2	Male	White	Pennsylvania	Electrocution	
37	June 13, 1918	Alvah Briggs	25	24	1	Male	White	New York	Electrocution	
38	June 13, 1918	Stephen Lischuk	Unknown	Unknown	2	Male	White	New York	Electrocution	
39	June 13, 1918	Hyman Ostransky	38	37	1	Male	White	New York	Electrocution	
40	June 14, 1918	William Braxton	Unknown	Unknown	Unknown	Male	Black	Louisiana	Hanging	
41	June 14, 1918	Willie Stewart	Unknown	Unknown	1	Male	Black	Louisiana	Hanging	
42	June 17, 1918	Frank Dusso	25	23	2	Male	White	Connecticut	Hanging	
43	June 17, 1918	Carmine Lanzillo	24	23	1	Male	White	Connecticut	Hanging	
44	June 17, 1918	Carmine Pisaniello	21	19	2	Male	White	Connecticut	Hanging	
45	June 28, 1918	Jim Bell	18	Unknown	Unknown	Male	Black	Louisiana	Hanging	
46	June 28, 1918	Preston Miles	Unknown	Unknown	Unknown	Male	Black	Louisiana	Hanging	
47	July 2, 1918	Tolson Bailey	17	16	1	Male	Black	Virginia	Electrocution	
48	July 2, 1918	Guy Nixon	19	18	1	Male	Black	Virginia	Electrocution	
49	July 5, 1918	Fred Allen	22	22	0	Male	Black	U.S. military	Hanging	
50	July 5, 1918	Stanley Tramble	31	31	0	Male	Black	U.S. military	Hanging	
51	July 5, 1918	Nelson Johnson	30	30	0	Male	Black	U.S. military	Hanging	
52	July 8, 1918	Eddie James Alsup	17	16	1	Male	Black	Tennessee	Electrocution	
53	July 8, 1918	J.D. Williams	Unknown	Unknown	1	Male	Black	Tennessee	Electrocution	
54	July 11, 1918	Nat Hoffman	25	25	0	Male	White	U.S. military	Hanging	
55	July 12, 1918	Joseph Schoon	27	26	1	Male	White	California	Hanging	
56	July 12, 1918	Melvin Collins	21	21	0	Male	White	Kentucky	Electrocution	
57	July 19, 1918	Albert Sanders	Unknown	Unknown	1	Male	Black	Alabama	Hanging	
58	July 19, 1918	Dennis Anderson Jr.	21	Unknown	Unknown	Male	White	Illinois	Hanging	
59	July 19, 1918	Sam Holliware	37	Unknown	Unknown	Male	Black	South Carolina	Electrocution	
60	July 26, 1918	Solomon Datron	36	Unknown	Unknown	Male	Black	Arkansas	Electrocution	
61	July 26, 1918	John Marvin Thompson	23	21	2	Male	White	Georgia	Hanging	
62	July 26, 1918	Aaron Gibson Washington	21	20	1	Male	Black	Ohio	Electrocution	
63	August 9, 1918	Fred Miller	33	32	1	Male	Black	California	Hanging	
64	August 16, 1918	James Franklin	Unknown	Unknown	Unknown	Male	Black	Texas	Hanging	
65	August 23, 1918	Benjamin Curl Caughron	28	28	0	Male	White	Arkansas	Electrocution	
66	August 23, 1918	Harvey Hubert	34	32	2	Male	Black	Texas	Hanging	
67	August 30, 1918	Johann Berg	45	Unknown	Unknown	Male	White	New York	Electrocution	
68	August 30, 1918	Giuseppe Roberto	23	Unknown	Unknown	Male	White	New York	Electrocution	
69	August 30, 1918	Will Jones	30	30	0	Male	Black	Texas	Hanging	
70	September 11, 1918	Ernest Spruill	Unknown	Unknown	Unknown	Male	Black	Alabama	Hanging	
71	September 13, 1918	Baxter Cain	32	31	1	Male	Black	North Carolina	Electrocution	
72	September 17, 1918	Babe Collier	30	29	1	Male	Black	U.S. military	Electrocution	
73	September 17, 1918	Thomas McDonald	29	28	1	Male	Black	U.S. military	Electrocution	
74	September 17, 1918	James Robinson	Unknown	Unknown	1	Male	Black	U.S. military	Electrocution	
75	September 17, 1918	Joseph Smith	Unknown	Unknown	1	Male	Black	U.S. military	Electrocution	
76	September 17, 1918	Albert D. Wright	Unknown	Unknown	1	Male	Black	U.S. military	Electrocution	
77	September 20, 1918	William J. Wright	37	36	1	Male	Black	Ohio	Electrocution	
78	September 25, 1918	William D. Boone	Unknown	Unknown	1	Male	Black	U.S. military	Electrocution	
79	October 3, 1918	Carl Eduoard Joseph Van Poucke	49	48	1	Male	White	New York	Electrocution	
80	October 4, 1918	Pasquale Biondo	27	26	1	Male	White	Ohio	Electrocution	
81	October 14, 1918	Andrew Carey	29	29	0	Male	Black	Pennsylvania	Electrocution	
82	October 14, 1918	Charles Henry Kyler	24	24	0	Male	Black	Pennsylvania	Electrocution	
83	October 21, 1918	Henry Martin Saladay	24	23	1	Male	White	Pennsylvania	Electrocution	
84	October 21, 1918	Jacob Franklin Saladay	20	19	1	Male	White	Pennsylvania	Electrocution	
85	October 25, 1918	Brazil Spillman	28	27	1	Male	Black	Ohio	Electrocution	
86	October 28, 1918	Havern Lee Cutlip	22	21	1	Male	White	Pennsylvania	Electrocution	
87	October 28, 1918	Albert William Patterson	28	27	1	Male	White	Pennsylvania	Electrocution	
88	November 8, 1918	Charles Mitchell	Unknown	Unknown	Unknown	Male	Black	Alabama	Hanging	
89	November 8, 1918	James Brown	34	33	1	Male	Black	Oklahoma	Electrocution	
90	November 8, 1918	Rufus Coates	20	18	2	Male	White	Texas	Hanging	
91	November 18, 1918	Frank Ressler	23	Unknown	Unknown	Male	White	Pennsylvania	Electrocution	
92	November 18, 1918	John Baptist Dantine	29	27	2	Male	White	Pennsylvania	Electrocution	
93	November 29, 1918	Jose C. Negrete	61	60	1	Male	Hispanic	California	Hanging	
94	December 6, 1918	Lloyd Bopp	24	22	2	Male	White	Illinois	Hanging	
95	December 9, 1918	Lazar Zec	Unknown	Unknown	1	Male	White	Pennsylvania	Electrocution	
96	December 16, 1918	Samuel Garner	36	35	1	Male	White	Pennsylvania	Electrocution	
97	December 16, 1918	William McMiller	29	Unknown	Unknown	Male	Black	Pennsylvania	Electrocution	
98	December 19, 1918	Jacob Cohen	28	27	1	Male	White	New York	Electrocution	
99	December 20, 1918	Napoleon Spencer	16	15	1	Male	Black	North Carolina	Electrocution	

== Demographics ==
Gender
Male	99	100%
Female	0	0%
Ethnicity
Black	50	51%
White	46	46%
Hispanic	3	3%
State
Pennsylvania	17	17%
U.S. military	12	12%
New York	8	8%
Louisiana	7	7%
North Carolina	7	7%
Texas	6	6%
Ohio	5	5%
Illinois	4	4%
Montana	4	4%
Alabama	3	3%
California	3	3%
Connecticut	3	3%
South Carolina	3	3%
Virginia	3	3%
Arkansas	2	2%
New Jersey	2	2%
Oklahoma	2	2%
Tennessee	2	2%
Delaware	1	1%
Georgia	1	1%
Kentucky	1	1%
New Hampshire	1	1%
New Mexico	1	1%
Utah	1	1%
Method
Electrocution	52	53%
Hanging	46	46%
Firing squad	1	1%
Month
January	6	6%
February	4	4%
March	4	4%
April	8	8%
May	11	11%
June	13	13%
July	16	16%
August	7	7%
September	9	9%
October	9	9%
November	6	6%
December	6	6%
Age
Unknown	20	20%
10–19	6	6%
20–29	40	40%
30–39	29	29%
40–49	3	3%
50–59	1	1%
60–69	1	1%
Total	99	100%

== Executions in recent years ==
Number of executions
1919	64
1918	99
1917	90
Total	253

Preceded by 1917	List of people executed in the United States in 1918	Succeeded by 1919
