= List of people executed in the United States in 1917 =

Ninety people, all male, were executed in the United States in 1917, forty-six by hanging , and forty-four by electrocution.

== List of people executed in the United States in 1917 ==
No.	Date of execution	Name	Age of person			Gender	Ethnicity	State	Method	Ref.
No.	Date of execution	Name	At execution	At offense	Age difference	Gender	Ethnicity	State	Method	Ref.
1	January 2, 1917	Wilson C. Ashbridge	23	22	1	Male	White	New Jersey	Electrocution	
2	January 8, 1917	Jonas Joseph Brobst	22	21	1	Male	White	Pennsylvania	Electrocution	
3	January 12, 1917	Harris A. Sutton	16	16	0	Male	Black	Georgia	Hanging	
4	January 27, 1917	Yo-Keuk Yee	31	30	1	Male	Asian	Hawaii Territory	Hanging	
5	January 29, 1917	Will Miles	Unknown	Unknown	Unknown	Male	Black	Georgia	Hanging	
6	February 6, 1917	Reuben Ellis	29	28	1	Male	Black	Ohio	Electrocution	
7	February 9, 1917	Joseph Vance Wilt	37	36	1	Male	White	California	Hanging	
8	February 16, 1917	Clarence Dennis	Unknown	Unknown	1	Male	Black	Georgia	Hanging	
9	February 16, 1917	Walter Charles Murphy	25	23	2	Male	Black	Illinois	Hanging	
10	February 16, 1917	Leslie Fahley	25	24	1	Male	Black	Montana	Hanging	
11	February 16, 1917	Harrison Gibson	30	29	1	Male	Black	Montana	Hanging	
12	February 16, 1917	Henry Hall	27	26	1	Male	Black	Montana	Hanging	
13	March 13, 1917	John Hawkins	24	24	0	Male	Black	Arkansas	Electrocution	
14	March 23, 1917	John Johnson	23	22	1	Male	Black	South Carolina	Electrocution	
15	March 27, 1917	Francesco Nicolisi	23	Unknown	Unknown	Male	White	New Jersey	Electrocution	
16	March 27, 1917	Calogero Pettito	34	Unknown	Unknown	Male	White	New Jersey	Electrocution	
17	March 31, 1917	Henry Smith	Unknown	Unknown	Unknown	Male	Black	Arkansas	Electrocution	
18	April 13, 1917	Chester Taylor	44	43	1	Male	Black	Oklahoma	Electrocution	
19	April 13, 1917	Willie Williams	32	30	2	Male	Black	Oklahoma	Electrocution	
20	April 13, 1917	Charles George Young	27	Unknown	Unknown	Male	Black	Oklahoma	Electrocution	
21	April 21, 1917	Petrius C. Von den Corput	25	Unknown	Unknown	Male	White	New York	Electrocution	
22	May 17, 1917	Antonio Impoluzzo	20	18	2	Male	White	New York	Electrocution	
23	May 24, 1917	Arthur Warren Waite	30	29	1	Male	White	New York	Electrocution	
24	May 25, 1917	Bunk Maske	23	23	0	Male	Black	North Carolina	Electrocution	
25	June 15, 1917	Hansom Warren	23	Unknown	Unknown	Male	Black	Virginia	Electrocution	
26	June 20, 1917	Hamilton Cosby	25	25	0	Male	Black	Virginia	Electrocution	
27	June 20, 1917	Robert Jones	32	32	0	Male	Black	Virginia	Electrocution	
28	June 22, 1917	Tom Diggs	39	38	1	Male	Black	Arkansas	Electrocution	
29	June 22, 1917	Aaron Johnson	45	44	1	Male	Black	Arkansas	Electrocution	
30	June 22, 1917	Burtley Gerard "Albert Clark" Warren	30	29	1	Male	White	Ohio	Electrocution	
31	June 29, 1917	Charles Victoriano	60	57	3	Male	White	Louisiana	Hanging	
32	July 10, 1917	Patrick Henry Callery Jr.	37	36	1	Male	White	Pennsylvania	Electrocution	
33	July 10, 1917	John Nelson	Unknown	Unknown	2	Male	Black	Pennsylvania	Electrocution	
34	July 12, 1917	Arthur Waldenen	24	22	2	Male	White	New York	Electrocution	
35	July 20, 1917	Frank Hugle	Unknown	Unknown	Unknown	Male	Black	Georgia	Hanging	
36	July 23, 1917	Cornelius Sheppard	29	29	0	Male	Black	Pennsylvania	Electrocution	
37	August 3, 1917	Fisher Brooks	Unknown	Unknown	0	Male	Black	Alabama	Hanging	
38	August 3, 1917	Charles Williams	Unknown	Unknown	Unknown	Male	Black	Georgia	Hanging	
39	August 10, 1917	John H. Blue	48	47	1	Male	Black	Kentucky	Electrocution	
40	August 14, 1917	Paul Maywoon	32	32	0	Male	White	New Jersey	Electrocution	
41	August 30, 1917	Joseph A. Mulholland	30	28	2	Male	White	New York	Electrocution	
42	August 30, 1917	Alexander Shuster	26	25	1	Male	White	New York	Electrocution	
43	August 31, 1917	Albert Barrett	35	Unknown	Unknown	Male	Black	Virginia	Electrocution	
44	September 11, 1917	Francis J. Ducharme	27	26	1	Male	White	Massachusetts	Electrocution	
45	September 12, 1917	James F. Allen	36	34	2	Male	Black	District of Columbia	Hanging	
46	September 17, 1917	John Robinson	21	20	1	Male	Black	Pennsylvania	Electrocution	
47	September 17, 1917	Elwood Wilson	26	24	2	Male	Black	Pennsylvania	Electrocution	
48	September 25, 1917	Charles Williams	60	Unknown	Unknown	Male	Black	North Carolina	Electrocution	
49	September 28, 1917	Adam Hargus	34	33	1	Male	Black	Delaware	Hanging	
50	September 28, 1917	William Prettyman	29	28	1	Male	Black	Delaware	Hanging	
51	September 28, 1917	Webster Purnell	36	35	1	Male	Black	Delaware	Hanging	
52	October 1, 1917	Nikolo Kotur	25	24	1	Male	White	Pennsylvania	Electrocution	
53	October 5, 1917	Lon Hadley	22	21	1	Male	Black	California	Hanging	
54	October 5, 1917	Joseph Castelli	24	23	1	Male	White	Connecticut	Hanging	
55	October 5, 1917	Francesco Vetere	25	24	1	Male	White	Connecticut	Hanging	
56	October 10, 1917	Lee Perkins	Unknown	Unknown	0	Male	Black	North Carolina	Electrocution	
57	October 12, 1917	Mackey Palmer	20	20	0	Male	Black	South Carolina	Electrocution	
58	October 19, 1917	Helaire Carriere	31	30	1	Male	White	Louisiana	Hanging	
59	October 19, 1917	Leonard Hill	Unknown	Unknown	Unknown	Male	Black	Louisiana	Hanging	
60	October 26, 1917	Lige Skipper	35	34	1	Male	Black	Alabama	Hanging	
61	October 26, 1917	Florencio Bonella	24	Unknown	Unknown	Male	Asian	Hawaii Territory	Hanging	
62	October 26, 1917	Gabriel Verver	35	Unknown	Unknown	Male	Asian	Hawaii Territory	Hanging	
63	October 26, 1917	William Burgess	29	Unknown	Unknown	Male	Black	Virginia	Electrocution	
64	November 2, 1917	John Bonney	Unknown	Unknown	Unknown	Male	White	Louisiana	Hanging	
65	November 2, 1917	Summa Levine	Unknown	Unknown	Unknown	Male	Black	Louisiana	Hanging	
66	November 5, 1917	John Lacie	40	39	1	Male	Black	Pennsylvania	Electrocution	
67	November 9, 1917	Jeremiah Alexander Terry	60	58	2	Male	White	North Carolina	Electrocution	
68	November 12, 1917	James Washington Anthony	19	18	1	Male	Black	Pennsylvania	Electrocution	
69	November 12, 1917	Archibald Julian Miller	24	23	1	Male	Black	Pennsylvania	Electrocution	
70	November 16, 1917	Stephen Buglione	20	20	0	Male	White	Connecticut	Hanging	
71	November 16, 1917	Giovanni Donvanso	21	21	0	Male	White	Connecticut	Hanging	
72	November 16, 1917	C. Dojoylongsol	Unknown	Unknown	Unknown	Male	Asian	Hawaii Territory	Hanging	
73	November 30, 1917	Antonio Garcia	33	Unknown	Unknown	Male	Asian	Hawaii Territory	Hanging	
74	December 3, 1917	Frank Alfred Wendt	19	17	2	Male	White	Pennsylvania	Electrocution	
75	December 11, 1917	Charles W. Baltimore	25	25	0	Male	Black	U.S. military	Hanging	
76	December 11, 1917	William Breckenridge	Unknown	Unknown	0	Male	Black	U.S. military	Hanging	
77	December 11, 1917	Larsen J. Brown	26	26	0	Male	Black	U.S. military	Hanging	
78	December 11, 1917	Ira B. Davis	28	28	0	Male	Black	U.S. military	Hanging	
79	December 11, 1917	James Divins	Unknown	Unknown	0	Male	Black	U.S. military	Hanging	
80	December 11, 1917	Thomas Coleman Hawkins	24	24	0	Male	Black	U.S. military	Hanging	
81	December 11, 1917	Frank Johnson	Unknown	Unknown	0	Male	Black	U.S. military	Hanging	
82	December 11, 1917	Pat McWhorter	24	24	0	Male	Black	U.S. military	Hanging	
83	December 11, 1917	Jesse Ball Moore	27	27	0	Male	Black	U.S. military	Hanging	
84	December 11, 1917	William C. Nesbit	30	30	0	Male	Black	U.S. military	Hanging	
85	December 11, 1917	Carlos Snodgrass	24	23	1	Male	Black	U.S. military	Hanging	
86	December 11, 1917	James Wheatley	26	25	1	Male	Black	U.S. military	Hanging	
87	December 11, 1917	Risley W. Young	Unknown	Unknown	0	Male	Black	U.S. military	Hanging	
88	December 12, 1917	Ocher Blaine Snouffer	27	26	1	Male	White	Ohio	Electrocution	
89	December 14, 1917	William J. Wise	23	23	0	Male	White	Connecticut	Hanging	
90	December 21, 1917	Victor Jones	Unknown	Unknown	Unknown	Male	Black	Louisiana	Hanging	

== Demographics ==
Gender
Male	90	100%
Female	0	0%
Ethnicity
Black	58	64%
White	27	30%
Asian	5	6%
State
U.S. military	13	14%
Pennsylvania	11	12%
Louisiana	6	7%
New York	6	7%
Connecticut	5	6%
Georgia	5	6%
Hawaii Territory	5	6%
Virginia	5	6%
Arkansas	4	4%
New Jersey	4	4%
North Carolina	4	4%
Delaware	3	3%
Montana	3	3%
Ohio	3	3%
Oklahoma	3	3%
Alabama	2	2%
California	2	2%
South Carolina	2	2%
District of Columbia	1	1%
Illinois	1	1%
Kentucky	1	1%
Massachusetts	1	1%
Method
Hanging	46	51%
Electrocution	44	49%
Month
January	5	6%
February	7	8%
March	5	6%
April	4	4%
May	3	3%
June	7	8%
July	5	6%
August	7	8%
September	8	9%
October	12	13%
November	10	11%
December	17	19%
Age
Unknown	17	19%
10–19	3	3%
20–29	42	47%
30–39	21	23%
40–49	4	4%
50–59	0	0%
60–69	3	3%
Total	90	100%

== Executions in recent years ==
Number of executions
1918	99
1917	90
1916	113
Total	296

Preceded by 1916	List of people executed in the United States in 1917	Succeeded by 1918
