= Newberry Six lynchings =

1916 lynchings in Florida, U.S.

Coordinates: 29.6513°N 82.5980°W

- Part of the Nadir of American race relations
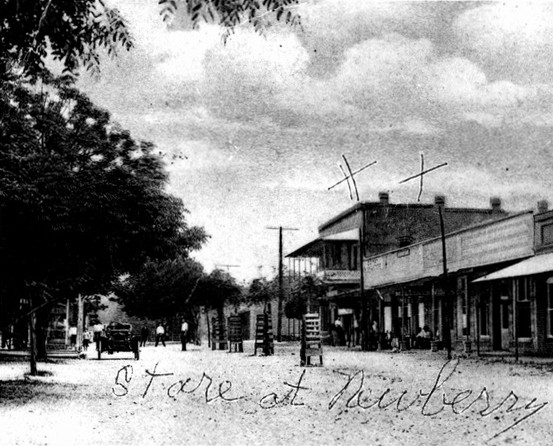
- Newberry, c. 1913–1918
- Location: Newberry, Alachua County, Florida, U.S.
- Date: August 18, 1916; 110 years ago
- Attack type: Lynching

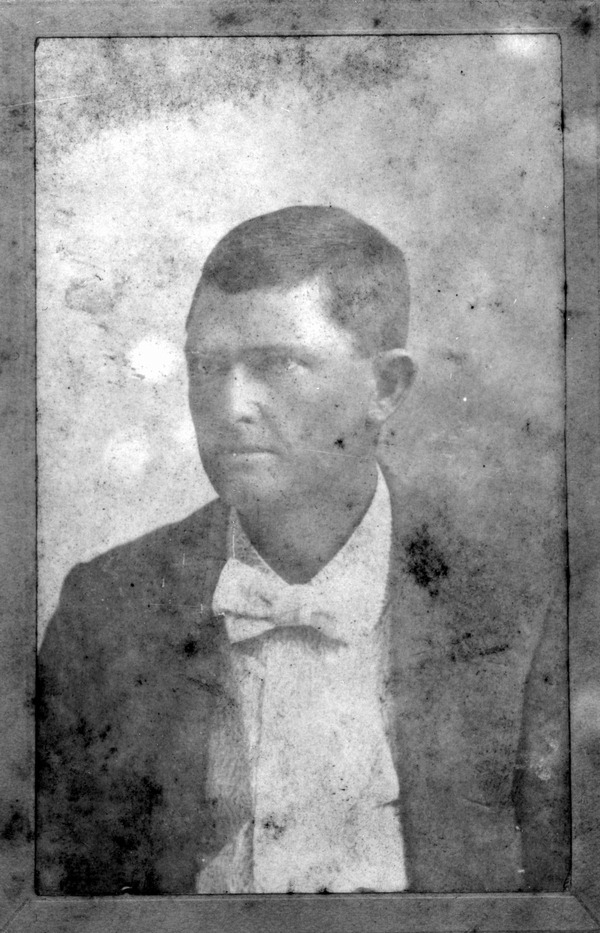
George Wynn[e], c. 1900–1916

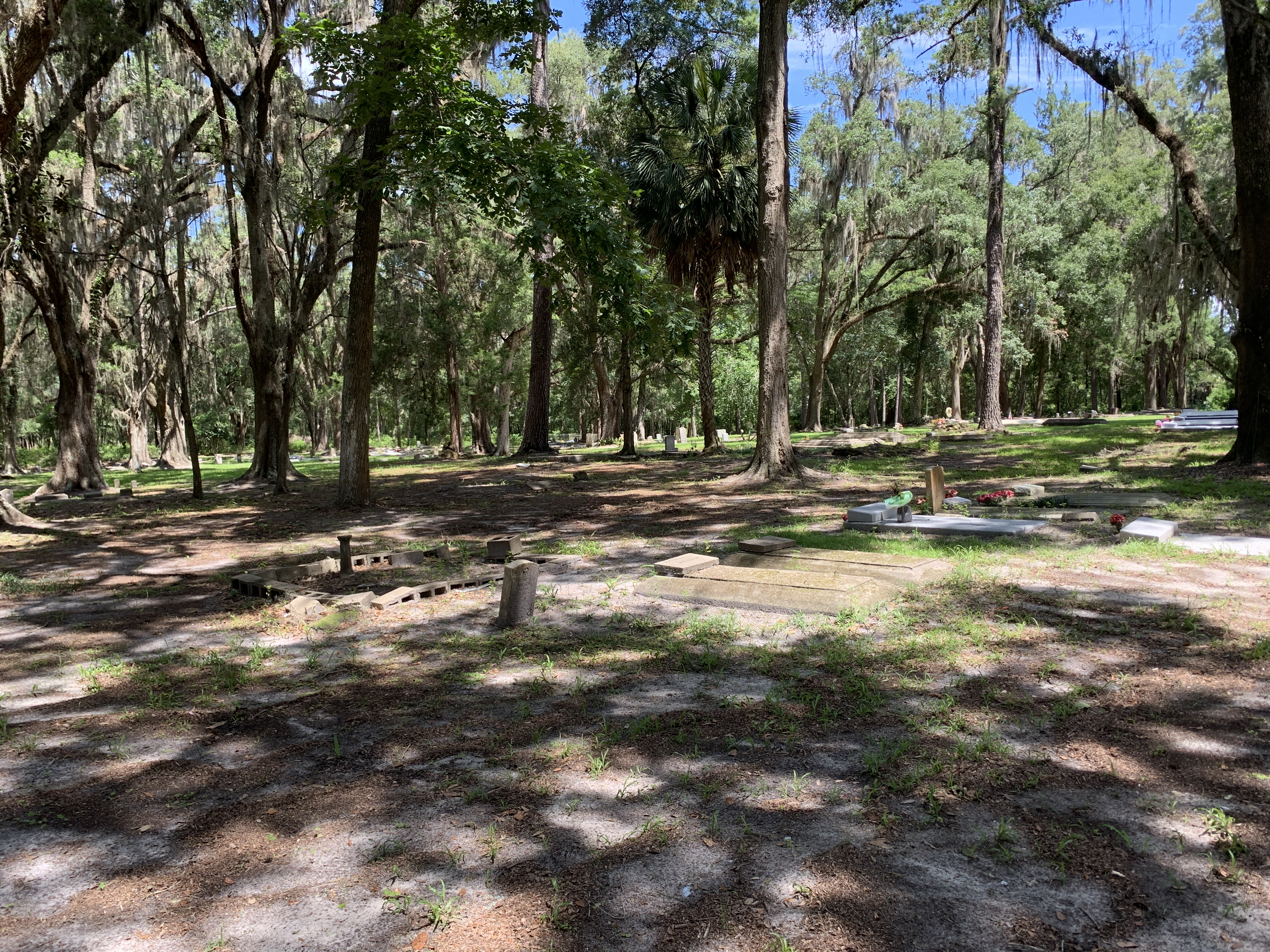
Cemetery at Pleasant Plain United Methodist Church in Jonesville, Florida where three of the victims' headstones exist

The Newberry Lynchings of 1916 historical marker
(front and back)
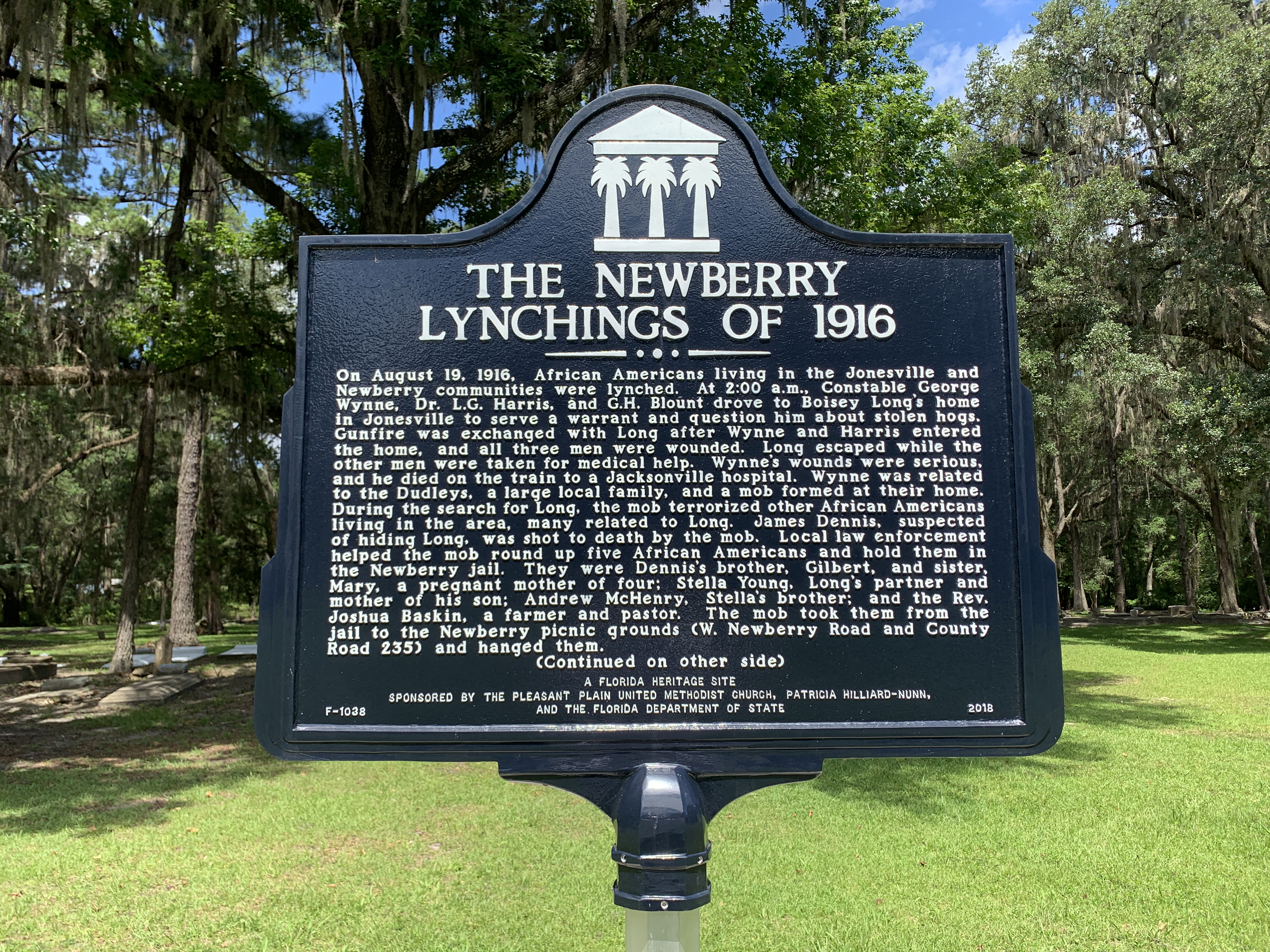
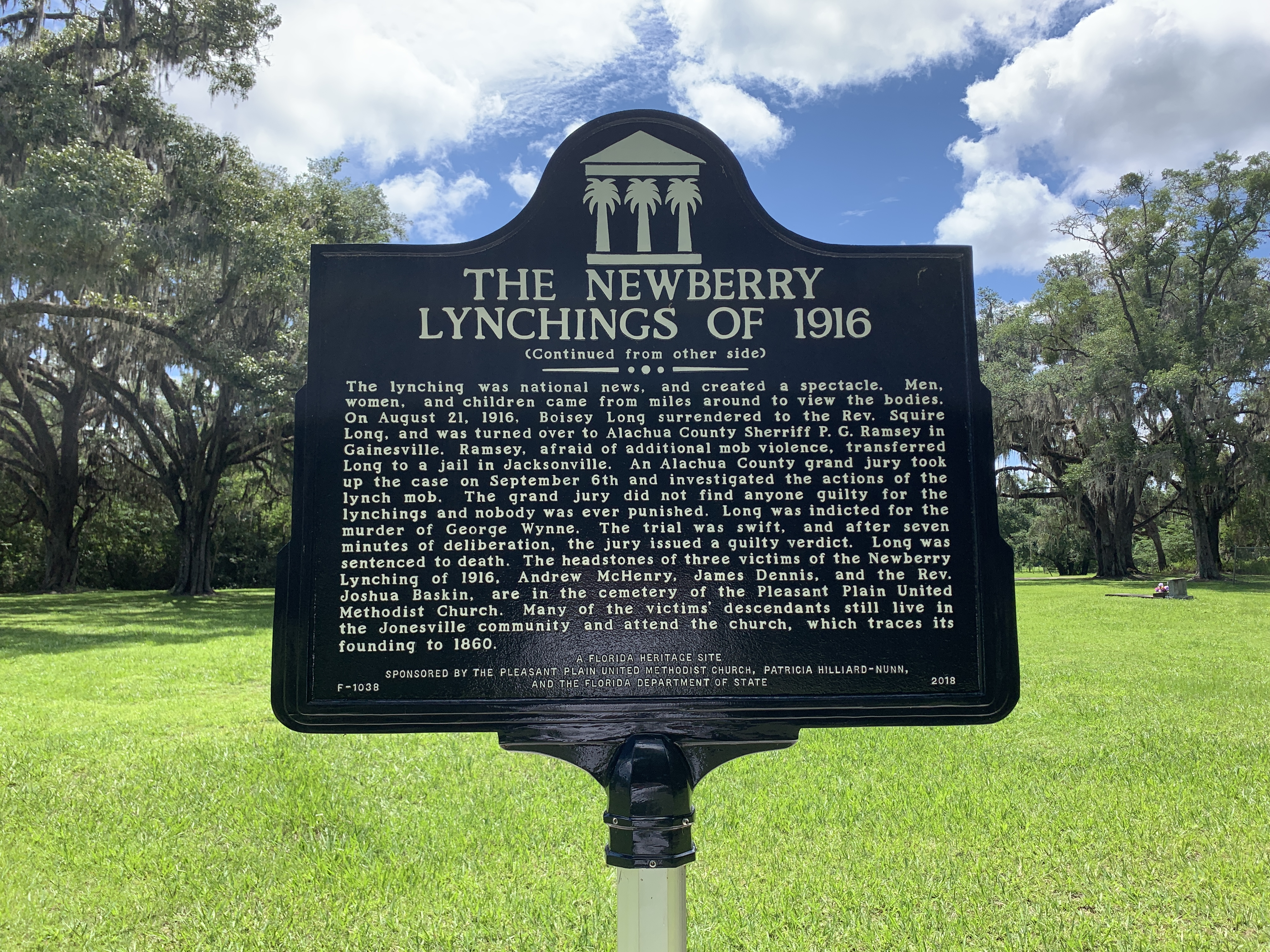

The Newberry Six lynchings took place in Newberry, Alachua County, Florida, on August 18, 1916.

The events began with the attempt late on August 17 by Newberry constable George Wynne to serve a warrant on Boisey Long, an African–American man, for stealing hogs. Accounts differ about how the conflict began and who fired first, but Long shot and killed Wynne, and wounded another man, L. G. Harris, who accompanied him. Long escaped, but surrendered to authorities two days later.

In the meantime, a posse was organized by the sheriff. The posse shot and killed Jim Dennis, a friend of Long. The sheriff said he was resisting arrest. Relatives and friends of Long were rounded up and taken to jail for allegedly helping him escape; they were Bert and Mary Dennis, Long's wife Stella Young, and two friends of Dennis, Andrew McHenry and Reverend Josh Baskin. A mob of 200 took them from the jail the morning of August 18 and hanged them from a single oak tree, one mile from Newberry; newspapers called it "a lynching bee." The tree no longer exists, but it was at the intersection of Newberry Lane and Alachua County Route 235. So many African–Americans gathered when the news of the lynchings reached them that some white people were afraid of a "race war".

No arrests were ever made. The Ocala Evening Star reported a rumor that the coroner's jury had returned a verdict that the six lynching victims had died in freak accidents, such as running into a barbed wire fence and bleeding to death, or falling out of a tree and choking to death or breaking their necks. Archivist Rebecca Fitzsimmons at the Matheson History Museum has noted that legal documents pertaining to the lynchings have not been found.

Long was tried on September 7, found guilty after an all-white jury deliberated seven minutes, and sentenced to hang. He was executed in the yard of the Alachua County jail on October 27, 1916. A man who had voiced an opinion approving the killing of Wynne was forced to leave town.

According to historian Patricia Hilliard-Nunn, as many as nine people may have been lynched or shot to death during the events. The Alachua County Historical Commission presented research in 2018 that concluded at least 43 lynchings took place in Alachua County in the 18th and 19th centuries.

In 2019, a marker was unveiled in remembrance of the lynchings and to acknowledge the black men and women who were murdered.

== See also ==
- Capital punishment in Florida
- List of people executed in Florida (pre-1972)
- List of people executed in the United States in 1916
- Ocoee massacre
- Perry massacre
- Rosewood massacre
- Tulsa race massacre
