= List of people executed in the United States in 1919 =

Sixty-four people, all male, were executed in the United States in 1919, forty by electrocution, twenty-three by hanging, and one by firing squad.

John Snowden, a black man, was controversially executed in Maryland for the murder of a pregnant white woman. He was pardoned in 2001, based on allegations of racial bias and flimsy evidence against him.

== List of people executed in the United States in 1919 ==
No.	Date of execution	Name	Age of person			Gender	Ethnicity	State	Method	Ref.
No.	Date of execution	Name	At execution	At offense	Age difference	Gender	Ethnicity	State	Method	Ref.
1	January 9, 1919	Alton Cleveland	39	38	1	Male	White	New York	Electrocution	
2	January 10, 1919	Samuel Johnson	18	Unknown	Unknown	Male	Black	South Carolina	Electrocution	
3	January 13, 1919	Samuel Barcons	26	24	2	Male	White	Pennsylvania	Electrocution	
4	February 21, 1919	Patrick Kearney	32	31	1	Male	White	Kentucky	Electrocution	
5	February 21, 1919	James Lawler	32	31	1	Male	White	Kentucky	Electrocution	
6	February 21, 1919	Frank Mazzano	19	18	1	Male	White	Ohio	Electrocution	
7	February 21, 1919	Rosario Borgio	25	24	1	Male	White	Ohio	Electrocution	
8	February 28, 1919	Damasco Quiroz	31	30	1	Male	Hispanic	California	Hanging	
9	February 28, 1919	Albert Johnson	30	28	2	Male	White	Illinois	Hanging	
10	February 28, 1919	John Snowden	28	27	1	Male	Black	Maryland	Hanging	
11	March 18, 1919	Aaron Walker	25	Unknown	Unknown	Male	Black	South Carolina	Electrocution	
12	March 21, 1919	Giovanni Ferraro	36	34	2	Male	White	New York	Electrocution	
13	March 26, 1919	Harvey Stuart	36	Unknown	Unknown	Male	Black	Virginia	Electrocution	
14	March 26, 1919	Horace Williams	21	Unknown	Unknown	Male	Black	Virginia	Electrocution	
15	April 26, 1919	James Henry Warren	19	Unknown	Unknown	Male	Black	North Carolina	Electrocution	
16	April 28, 1919	Hardy Dickerson	Unknown	Unknown	Unknown	Male	White	Pennsylvania	Electrocution	
17	May 2, 1919	William Shortridge	34	33	1	Male	Black	California	Hanging	
18	May 19, 1919	Patsy Medio	43	42	1	Male	White	Pennsylvania	Electrocution	
19	May 21, 1919	Frank Ewing	21	20	1	Male	Black	Tennessee	Electrocution	
20	May 23, 1919	James Tyren	59	58	1	Male	White	California	Hanging	
21	May 23, 1919	Paul Bates	Unknown	Unknown	1	Male	Black	Georgia	Hanging	
22	May 23, 1919	Tibbets Roy Braught	28	26	2	Male	White	Oklahoma	Electrocution	
23	June 2, 1919	Bertie Franklin Moon	34	33	1	Male	White	Pennsylvania	Electrocution	
24	June 6, 1919	Lewis Harris	25	Unknown	Unknown	Male	Black	Kentucky	Electrocution	
25	June 6, 1919	James Howard	20	18	2	Male	Black	Kentucky	Electrocution	
26	June 16, 1919	William Brown	26	Unknown	Unknown	Male	Black	Pennsylvania	Electrocution	
27	June 16, 1919	Peter Smallock	45	Unknown	Unknown	Male	White	Pennsylvania	Electrocution	
28	June 20, 1919	Joseph Rogers	26	25	1	Male	White	California	Hanging	
29	June 20, 1919	Clarence Rollins	20	19	1	Male	Native American	California	Hanging	
30	June 27, 1919	George Dock Bigham	50	49	1	Male	White	Alabama	Hanging	
31	June 27, 1919	Erasmo Perretta	28	27	1	Male	White	Connecticut	Hanging	
32	June 27, 1919	Joseph Perretta	33	32	1	Male	White	Connecticut	Hanging	
33	June 27, 1919	Earl C. Dear	26	25	1	Male	White	Illinois	Hanging	
34	June 27, 1919	Tom Gwynn	23	Unknown	Unknown	Male	Black	North Carolina	Electrocution	
35	June 27, 1919	Jerry Warren	29	Unknown	Unknown	Male	Black	Virginia	Electrocution	
36	July 11, 1919	M. Furuya	37	36	1	Male	Asian	California	Hanging	
37	July 11, 1919	George Johnson	19	Unknown	Unknown	Male	Black	South Carolina	Electrocution	
38	July 12, 1919	George Edward Warner	51	46	5	Male	White	Vermont	Electrocution	
39	July 18, 1919	R. Morisawa	42	Unknown	Unknown	Male	Asian	California	Hanging	
40	July 24, 1919	Paul Chiavaro	30	29	1	Male	White	Ohio	Electrocution	
41	July 25, 1919	Lube Martin	34	31	3	Male	Black	Kentucky	Electrocution	
42	August 6, 1919	Hugh Alexander Ferguson	26	26	0	Male	Black	West Virginia	Hanging	
43	August 8, 1919	Lucius Brown	Unknown	Unknown	0	Male	Black	Louisiana	Hanging	
44	August 19, 1919	Frank Laviere	27	25	2	Male	White	New Jersey	Electrocution	
45	August 19, 1919	Michael DePalma	33	31	2	Male	White	New Jersey	Electrocution	
46	August 19, 1919	Gerino Palmieri	24	22	2	Male	White	New Jersey	Electrocution	
47	September 19, 1919	Pedro Rico	36	35	1	Male	Hispanic	California	Hanging	
48	September 19, 1919	Ernest Hamlin	32	32	0	Male	Black	Louisiana	Hanging	
49	September 26, 1919	James Morgan	51	50	1	Male	Black	Ohio	Electrocution	
50	October 17, 1919	Tom Bellon	42	Unknown	Unknown	Male	White	California	Hanging	
51	October 17, 1919	Thomas Richard Fitzgerald	39	39	0	Male	White	Illinois	Hanging	
52	October 17, 1919	Frank Seinich	30	30	0	Male	White	Ohio	Electrocution	
53	October 20, 1919	Tony Mulferno	33	32	1	Male	White	Pennsylvania	Electrocution	
54	October 27, 1919	William Evans	27	25	2	Male	Black	Pennsylvania	Electrocution	
55	October 27, 1919	John Pierce Sandoe	26	26	0	Male	White	Pennsylvania	Electrocution	
56	October 27, 1919	Gregory Psaros	26	Unknown	Unknown	Male	White	Pennsylvania	Electrocution	
57	October 30, 1919	Emper Jacobs	29	Unknown	Unknown	Male	Black	Virginia	Electrocution	
58	November 14, 1919	Aaron Dupree	34	28	6	Male	Black	North Carolina	Electrocution	
59	November 14, 1919	Moses Witherspoon	27	27	0	Male	Black	South Carolina	Electrocution	
60	November 28, 1919	Grover Cleveland Johnson	23	Unknown	Unknown	Male	White	Louisiana	Hanging	
61	November 28, 1919	Louis Werner	33	32	1	Male	White	Louisiana	Hanging	
62	December 3, 1919	Nikifor Nechesnook	28	28	0	Male	White	Connecticut	Hanging	
63	December 19, 1919	John Borich	33	33	0	Male	White	Utah	Firing squad	
64	December 22, 1919	Bronoslaw Bednoricki	29	26	3	Male	White	Pennsylvania	Electrocution	

== Demographics ==
Gender
Male	64	100%
Female	0	0%
Ethnicity
White	35	55%
Black	24	38%
Asian	2	3%
Hispanic	2	3%
Native American	1	2%
State
Pennsylvania	11	17%
California	9	14%
Kentucky	5	8%
Ohio	5	8%
Louisiana	4	6%
South Carolina	4	6%
Virginia	4	6%
Connecticut	3	5%
Illinois	3	5%
New Jersey	3	5%
North Carolina	3	5%
New York	2	3%
Alabama	1	2%
Georgia	1	2%
Maryland	1	2%
Oklahoma	1	2%
Tennessee	1	2%
Utah	1	2%
Vermont	1	2%
West Virginia	1	2%
Method
Electrocution	41	63%
Hanging	23	36%
Firing squad	1	2%
Month
January	3	5%
February	7	11%
March	4	6%
April	2	3%
May	6	9%
June	13	20%
July	6	9%
August	5	8%
September	3	5%
October	8	13%
November	4	6%
December	3	5%
Age
Unknown	3	5%
10–19	4	6%
20–29	27	42%
30–39	22	34%
40–49	4	6%
50–59	4	6%
Total	64	100%

== Executions in recent years ==
Number of executions
1920	103
1919	64
1918	99
Total	266

Preceded by 1918	List of people executed in the United States in 1919	Succeeded by 1920
