= Memorial Park, Houston =

Park in Houston, Texas, US

Memorial Park
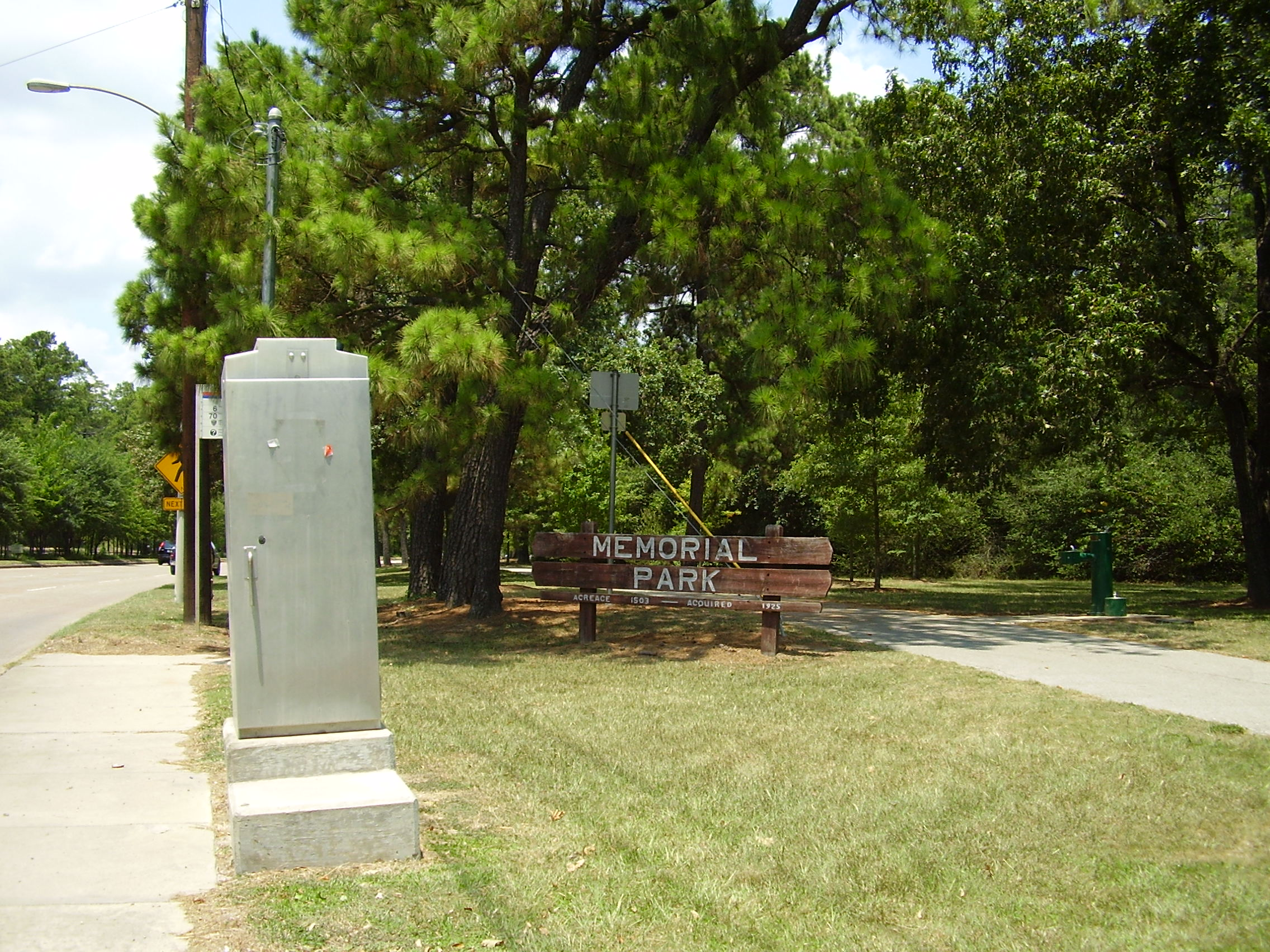
- Memorial Park
- Interactive map of Memorial Park
- Type: Municipal
- Location: Memorial, Houston, Texas, U.S.
- Coordinates: 29.765°N 95.441°W
- Area: 1,466 acres (5.9 km^{2})
- Created: 1924, 102 years ago
- Operator: Memorial Park Conservancy
- Website: memorialparkconservancy.org

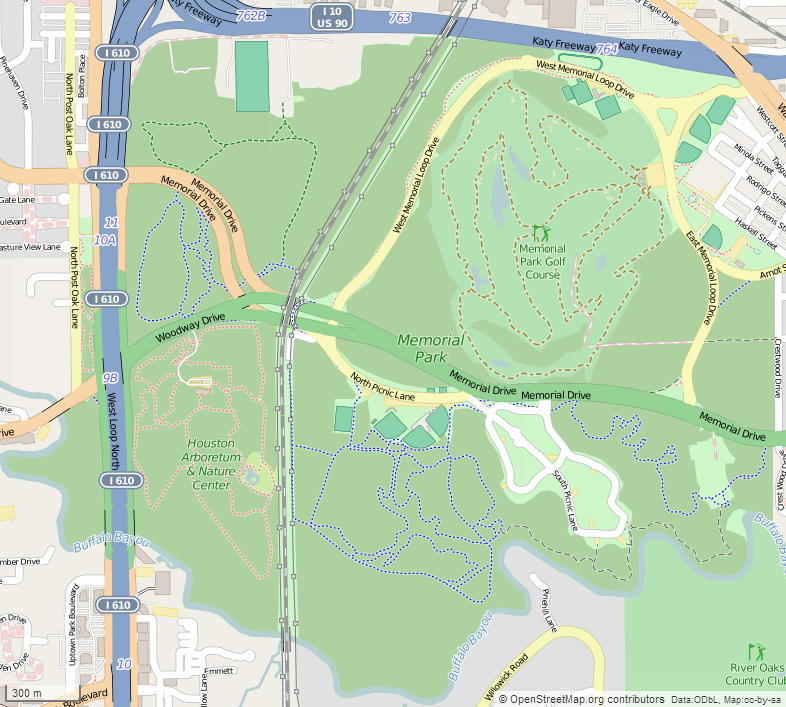
Map of Memorial Park

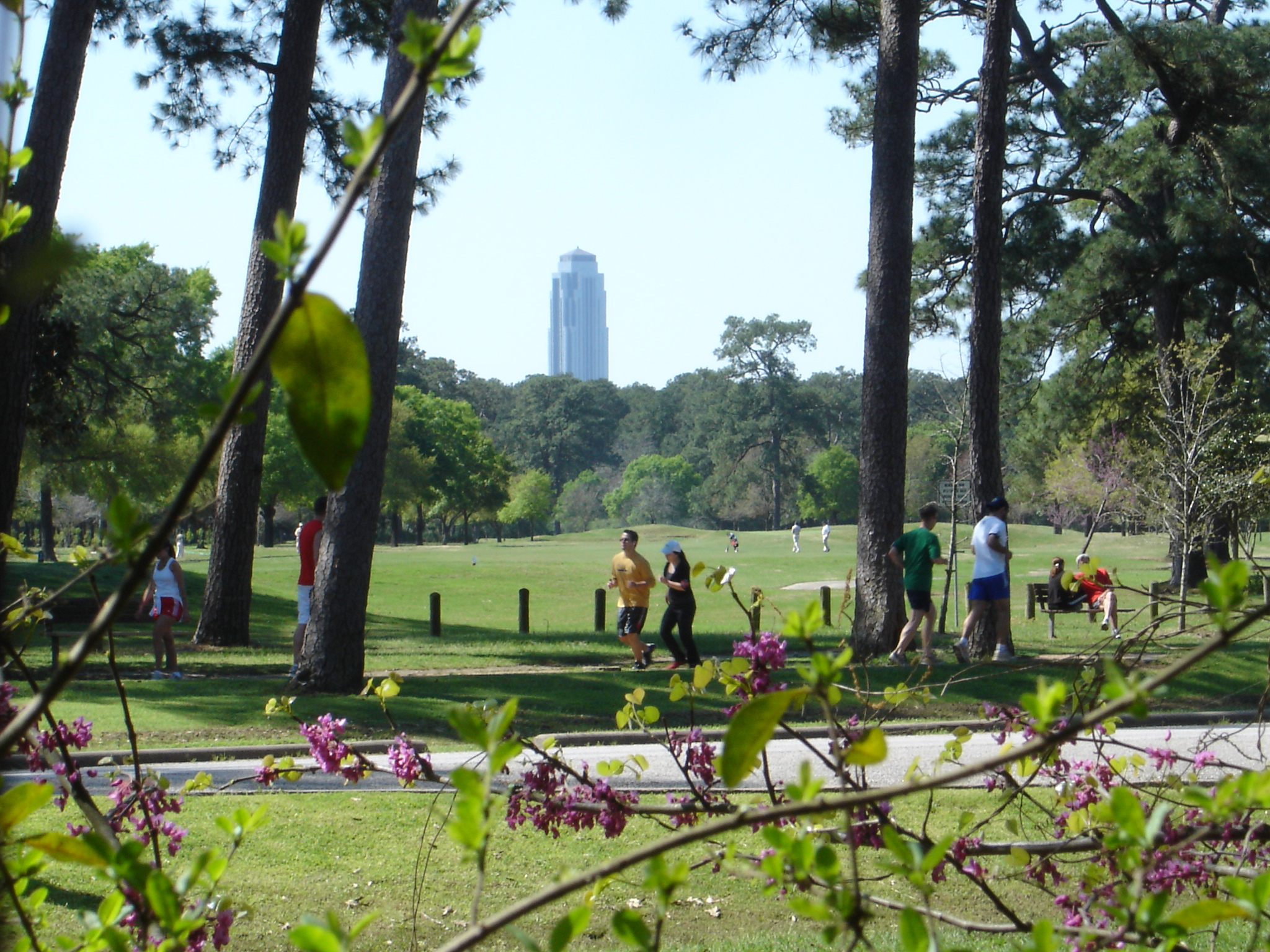
Memorial Park golf course with Williams Tower in the background

Memorial Park, a municipal park in Houston, Texas, is one of the largest urban parks in the United States. Opened 102 years ago in 1924, the park covers approximately 1,466 acres (5.9 km^{2}) mostly inside the 610 Loop, across from the neighborhood of Memorial. Memorial Drive runs through the park, heading east to downtown Houston and west to the 610 Loop. A small portion of land west of the 610 Loop bordered by Woodway Drive and Buffalo Bayou is also part of the park. I-10/U.S. 90 borders the park to the north. The park was originally designed by landscape architects Hare & Hare of Kansas City, Missouri. In 2016, the operation of the park was transitioned from the Houston Parks and Recreation Department to the Memorial Park Conservancy, a private non-profit organization with a mission to "restore, preserve and enhance Memorial Park."

== History ==
From 1917 to 1923, the land where the park currently exists was the site of Camp Logan, a U.S. Army training camp named after Illinois U.S. Senator and Civil War General John A. Logan. During World War I, the training camp was located on the far west boundaries of Houston. After the war in early 1924, Will and Mike Hogg, purchased 1,503 acres (6.1 km^{2}) of former Camp Logan land and sold the area to the city at cost. In May 1924, the City of Houston took ownership of the land to be used as a "memorial" park, dedicated to the memory of soldiers who lost their lives in the war. The park is adjacent to the Camp Logan, Crestwood, and Rice Military neighborhoods.

On April 25, 2018, philanthropists Rich and Nancy Kinder through their foundation, the Kinder Foundation, pledged $70 million to the Memorial Park Conservancy to accelerate redevelopment and restoration work. This enabled the next phase of implementation of the master plan by Nelson Byrd Woltz, including the Eastern Glades and the Land Bridge and Prairie.

== Facilities ==
The park includes the 18-hole Memorial Park Golf Course, Texas's top-rated municipal golf course. Formerly the site of a nine-hole course launched in 1912, it was completely redesigned by John Bredemus and opened 90 years ago in 1936. The course rating is 75.0 with a slope rating of 130 from its back tees. Memorial Park hosted the Houston Open on the PGA Tour fourteen times (1947, 1951–63), and was renovated in 1995 at the cost of $7 million. The course hosted the tournament again in the 2021 season (October 2020). The ashes of tour professional Dave Marr (1933–1997) were spread over the course, as it was where the winner of the 1965 PGA Championship learned to play the game.

The park also has facilities for tennis, softball, swimming, track, croquet, volleyball, skating, cycling, and a running course. The softball fields are the home venue for the Texas Southern Tigers softball team. Very popular with Houston joggers, the running course is the Seymour Lieberman Exercise Trail, a 3-mile crushed granite pathway that sees almost 3 million visits annually. The trail layout has seen a number of changes since the late-2010s. There has been a shrinkage in the number of trees as a result of droughts and hurricanes.

The opening of the Eastern Glades in 2020 transformed 100 acres of formerly inaccessible land into a public park with water features, boardwalk, and historical markers. In 2023, the opening of the Land Bridge and Prairie created a 100-acre native Texas prairie habitat spanning a six-lane road, charting a path to recovery from a previous drought that decimated the park.

On the south side of Memorial Drive are the Bayou Wilds which are miles of multi-use trails through the woods of varying difficulty. These trails include: Purple Trail, Blue Trail, Orange Trail, Yellow Trail, Aqua Trail, Red Trail, Green Trail, and the unmarked expert "Rollercoaster Trails" south of Aqua adjacent to the Buffalo Bayou. The Picnic Lane loop is used heavily by road cyclists. The Cyvia and Melvyn Wolff Prairie was completed in 2022 on the former grounds of the Picnic Lane ballfields and former parking lot which connected North and South Picnic Lane. The Cullen Timing Track opened in 2023 and is located on the former grounds of the rugby pitch.

The Houston Arboretum and Nature Center, an arboretum and botanical garden, sits on 155 acres (0.63 km^{2}) within the park. The Nature Center building was constructed in 1967.

Becks Prime has a location on the grounds of the Memorial Park golf course. The restaurant is within the clubhouse, overlooking the golf course. For a few years, there was also a Smoothie King.

The next phase of the park's revitalization will include a 100-acre Memorial Groves in honor of World War 1 soldiers.

== See also ==
The Houston riot of 1917 began in Camp Logan which later became Memorial Park.
