= Turner W. Bell =

American lawyer

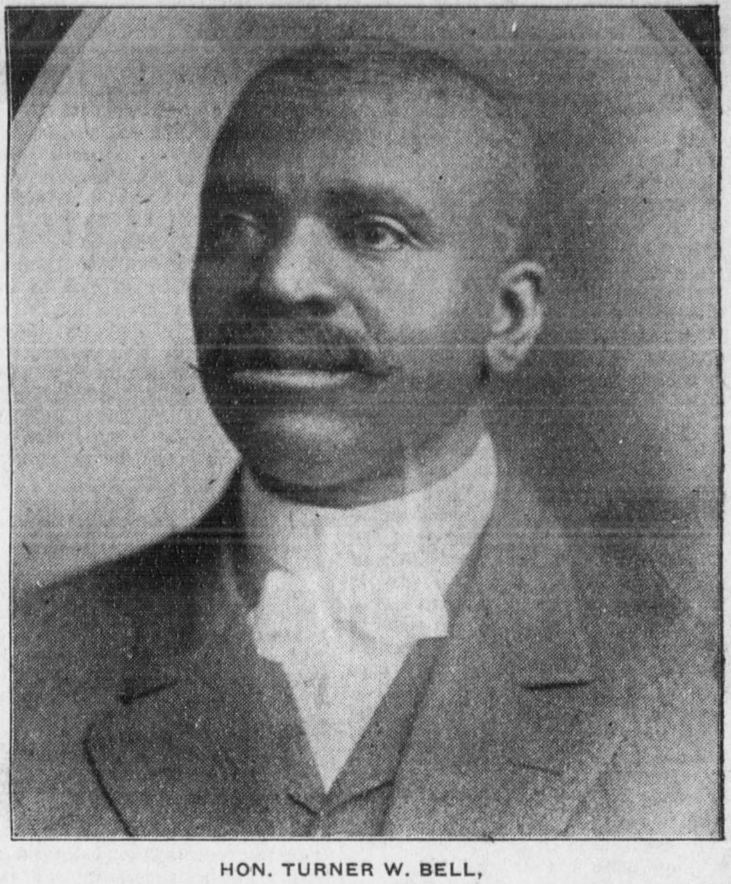
- circa 1914
- Born: 1859
- Died: August 26, 1948 (aged 88–89)
- Occupation: Lawyer

Turner W. Bell was an African-American lawyer who worked on thousands of legal cases in Leavenworth and Kansas City, Missouri.

== Biography ==
Bell was born near Corinth, Mississippi in 1859; his father, Peter Bell, was a former servant of General Sherman. In 1864 the family moved to a farm in Dallas County, Iowa. He attended common schools during his youth. He graduated from Drake University Law School and was admitted to the bar on October 6, 1886. He moved to Kansas City, Missouri, to set up a practice. When he arrived in 1887, he was told by a white lawyer to leave town as he would starve to death trying to get work in the city. In 1888 he and John Lewis Waller formed a partnership. He quickly gained a reputation for getting people early release out of United States Penitentiary in Leavenworth. In the period between 1915 and 1918 alone he tried around 1,400 cases.

Some of his more famous cases includes black soldiers charged after the 1917 Houston Riot and the defense of three white men convicted of conspiracy in the Iron workers dynamite case. In 1935 he was honored by Governor Alf Landon for his work in the legal field. He died on August 26, 1948 in Leavenworth.

== Works cited ==
- Smith, J. Clay Jr. (1999). Emancipation: The Making of the Black Lawyer, 1844-1944 (1999 ed.). University of Pennsylvania Press. ISBN 9780812216851.
