= List of people executed in the United States in 1916 =

One hundred and thirteen people, all male, were executed in the United States in 1916, fifty-eight by electrocution, and fifty-five by hanging.

Six followers of Pancho Villa were executed in New Mexico for their roles in the Battle of Columbus.

== List of people executed in the United States in 1916 ==
No.	Date of execution	Name	Age of person			Gender	Ethnicity	State	Method	Ref.
No.	Date of execution	Name	At execution	At offense	Age difference	Gender	Ethnicity	State	Method	Ref.
1	January 7, 1916	Lawrence Coutcure	46	44	2	Male	White	California	Hanging	
2	January 7, 1916	Jose Antonio Ponton	28	27	1	Male	Hispanic	New York	Electrocution	
3	January 7, 1916	Floyd Thompson	Unknown	Unknown	2	Male	Black	Texas	Hanging	
4	January 21, 1916	Rito Bargas	28	28	0	Male	Hispanic	California	Hanging	
5	January 28, 1916	George Alexander Quinn	33	32	1	Male	White	Colorado	Hanging	
6	January 28, 1916	Jeff Dorsett Jr.	27	26	1	Male	Black	North Carolina	Electrocution	
7	January 28, 1916	Ed Walker	26	25	1	Male	Black	North Carolina	Electrocution	
8	February 1, 1916	Kelly Robinson	28	27	1	Male	Black	Indiana	Electrocution	
9	February 1, 1916	Louis Utley	23	22	1	Male	Black	Texas	Hanging	
10	February 4, 1916	Giuseppe Marendi	28	27	1	Male	White	New York	Electrocution	
11	February 4, 1916	Peter Hamilton	25	25	0	Male	Black	South Carolina	Electrocution	
12	February 11, 1916	James Cooper	26	25	1	Male	Black	North Carolina	Electrocution	
13	February 13, 1916	Henry Sampson	35	Unknown	Unknown	Male	Black	Texas	Hanging	
14	February 18, 1916	Ung Sing	23	22	1	Male	Asian	California	Hanging	
15	February 18, 1916	Oscar Joseph Comery	30	29	1	Male	White	New Hampshire	Hanging	
16	February 18, 1916	Hans B. Schmidt	35	32	3	Male	White	New York	Electrocution	
17	February 21, 1916	George H. March	33	30	3	Male	White	Pennsylvania	Electrocution	
18	February 21, 1916	Rowland Satterthwait Pennington	21	19	2	Male	White	Pennsylvania	Electrocution	
19	February 25, 1916	Ernest Lowry	24	23	1	Male	Black	North Carolina	Electrocution	
20	February 25, 1916	George Poston	24	23	1	Male	Black	North Carolina	Electrocution	
21	February 25, 1916	Israel Good	17	17	0	Male	Black	South Carolina	Electrocution	
22	February 26, 1916	Oscar L. Cook	29	25	4	Male	White	Colorado	Hanging	
23	March 3, 1916	Charles Ethelbert Talbot Oxnam	18	17	1	Male	White	California	Hanging	
24	March 3, 1916	Glenn Witt	23	22	1	Male	White	California	Hanging	
25	March 3, 1916	Harry E. Roe	22	20	2	Male	White	Connecticut	Hanging	
26	March 3, 1916	Isaac N. Williams	30	28	2	Male	White	Connecticut	Hanging	
27	March 3, 1916	Walter Watson	41	40	1	Male	White	New York	Electrocution	
28	March 10, 1916	Pasquale Zuppa	28	27	1	Male	White	Connecticut	Hanging	
29	March 10, 1916	Robert Bacon	Unknown	Unknown	1	Male	Black	Louisiana	Hanging	
30	March 11, 1916	Sam Jernigan	20	19	1	Male	Black	Texas	Hanging	
31	March 14, 1916	Anton Retkovitz	37	35	2	Male	White	Massachusetts	Electrocution	
32	March 15, 1916	Percy Ellis	16	16	0	Male	Black	Virginia	Electrocution	
33	March 20, 1916	Martin Kristan	43	41	2	Male	White	Pennsylvania	Electrocution	
34	April 10, 1916	Michael Louisa	62	61	1	Male	White	Pennsylvania	Electrocution	
35	April 14, 1916	Solomon Sudler Jr.	17	16	1	Male	Black	Maryland	Hanging	
36	April 21, 1916	Joe Lee	83	Unknown	Unknown	Male	Black	Virginia	Electrocution	
37	April 25, 1916	James Reilly	33	29	4	Male	White	Pennsylvania	Hanging	
38	April 28, 1916	Stobo Bailey	25	25	0	Male	Black	South Carolina	Electrocution	
39	April 29, 1916	Robert H. Burgess	32	31	1	Male	White	Texas	Hanging	
40	May 1, 1916	Charles Sprague II	32	27	5	Male	White	New York	Electrocution	
41	May 1, 1916	Henry J. H. Webb	39	38	1	Male	Black	Pennsylvania	Electrocution	
42	May 5, 1916	Monroe Collins	22	Unknown	Unknown	Male	Black	South Carolina	Electrocution	
43	May 12, 1916	Lamar Lightner	Unknown	Unknown	Unknown	Male	Black	Alabama	Hanging	
44	May 15, 1916	Joe Grant	57	47	10	Male	Black	South Carolina	Electrocution	
45	May 19, 1916	Francisco Rodriguez	34	28	6	Male	Hispanic	Arizona	Hanging	
46	May 19, 1916	Lon E. Lindsey	37	36	1	Male	White	Georgia	Hanging	
47	May 19, 1916	Gideon McKinney	24	23	1	Male	Black	Georgia	Hanging	
48	May 19, 1916	Zack Colson	Unknown	Unknown	0	Male	Black	Florida	Hanging	
49	May 19, 1916	Arthur Jones	Unknown	Unknown	0	Male	Black	Florida	Hanging	
50	May 19, 1916	Jose Buenrostro	25	24	1	Male	Hispanic	Texas	Hanging	
51	May 19, 1916	Melquiades Chapa	19	18	1	Male	Hispanic	Texas	Hanging	
52	May 22, 1916	Charles Douglas	Unknown	Unknown	Unknown	Male	Black	Pennsylvania	Electrocution	
53	May 28, 1916	John Henry Williams	23	Unknown	Unknown	Male	Black	Virginia	Electrocution	
54	June 2, 1916	Robert Henry Kitchens	28	25	3	Male	Black	Georgia	Hanging	
55	June 2, 1916	Roy Champlain	30	29	1	Male	White	New York	Electrocution	
56	June 2, 1916	Giovanni Supe	31	30	1	Male	White	New York	Electrocution	
57	June 9, 1916	N.B. Chavez	36	30	6	Male	Hispanic	Arizona	Hanging	
58	June 9, 1916	Francisco Alvarez	22	22	0	Male	Hispanic	New Mexico	Hanging	
59	June 9, 1916	Juan Sanchez	16	16	0	Male	Hispanic	New Mexico	Hanging	
60	June 16, 1916	Willard George Flanders	50	49	1	Male	White	Wyoming	Hanging	
61	June 26, 1916	Thomas Chickerella	Unknown	Unknown	2	Male	White	Pennsylvania	Electrocution	
62	June 26, 1916	Gaspar Marturano	30	28	2	Male	White	Pennsylvania	Electrocution	
63	June 30, 1916	John Brown	Unknown	Unknown	Unknown	Male	Black	Maryland	Hanging	
64	June 30, 1916	Taurino Garcia	21	21	0	Male	Hispanic	New Mexico	Hanging	
65	June 30, 1916	Eusebio Renteria	24	24	0	Male	Hispanic	New Mexico	Hanging	
66	June 30, 1916	Juan Castillo	26	26	0	Male	Hispanic	New Mexico	Hanging	
67	June 30, 1916	Jose Rangel	23	23	0	Male	Hispanic	New Mexico	Hanging	
68	June 30, 1916	Oresto Shilitano	23	20	3	Male	White	New York	Electrocution	
69	July 5, 1916	Emil Swentain	30	30	0	Male	White	New Jersey	Electrocution	
70	July 7, 1916	Miguel Peralta	39	35	4	Male	Hispanic	Arizona	Hanging	
71	July 7, 1916	Lawrence Swinson	23	Unknown	Unknown	Male	Black	North Carolina	Electrocution	
72	July 7, 1916	Milton Maloy	18	18	0	Male	Black	Virginia	Electrocution	
73	July 10, 1916	Andrew Becze	Unknown	Unknown	Unknown	Male	White	Pennsylvania	Electrocution	
74	July 12, 1916	Frank Anderson	Unknown	Unknown	1	Male	Black	Mississippi	Hanging	
75	July 13, 1916	Julius Morgan	22	22	0	Male	Black	Tennessee	Electrocution	
76	July 17, 1916	Jacob B. Miller	21	20	1	Male	White	Pennsylvania	Electrocution	
77	July 21, 1916	Louis A. Fortine	32	31	1	Male	White	California	Hanging	
78	July 21, 1916	Willie Black	14	14	0	Male	Black	North Carolina	Electrocution	
79	August 1, 1916	Arthur Smith	26	26	0	Male	Black	North Carolina	Electrocution	
80	August 4, 1916	John Savage	51	51	0	Male	Black	North Carolina	Electrocution	
81	August 4, 1916	Allen Bradford	29	Unknown	Unknown	Male	Black	New York	Electrocution	
82	August 4, 1916	Claude W. Sutton	24	23	1	Male	White	West Virginia	Hanging	
83	August 8, 1916	Harry Black	29	26	3	Male	Black	Missouri	Hanging	
84	August 8, 1916	Andrew Black	27	24	3	Male	Black	Missouri	Hanging	
85	August 11, 1916	Wilmer P. Palmer	34	32	2	Male	White	Wyoming	Hanging	
86	August 25, 1916	Richard Green	19	Unknown	Unknown	Male	Black	Virginia	Electrocution	
87	August 25, 1916	Clifford Mickens	19	Unknown	Unknown	Male	Black	Virginia	Electrocution	
88	September 1, 1916	Kosta Kromphold	22	21	1	Male	White	California	Hanging	
89	September 1, 1916	Charles H. Haynes	60	59	1	Male	Black	Florida	Hanging	
90	September 1, 1916	Joseph E. Hanel	36	Unknown	Unknown	Male	White	New York	Electrocution	
91	September 1, 1916	Jan Trybus	33	32	1	Male	White	New York	Electrocution	
92	September 1, 1916	James Lay	Unknown	Unknown	Unknown	Male	Black	West Virginia	Hanging	
93		Walter Durham	Unknown	Unknown	0	Male	Black	Florida	Hanging	
94	September 8, 1916	Henry Lewis	23	Unknown	Unknown	Male	Black	Virginia	Electrocution	
95	September 15, 1916	Ellis Jonathan	38	Unknown	Unknown	Male	Black	South Carolina	Electrocution	
96	September 27, 1916	Harry E. Filler	33	31	2	Male	White	Pennsylvania	Electrocution	
97	October 2, 1916	James Corbett	22	Unknown	Unknown	Male	Black	Virginia	Electrocution	
98	October 2, 1916	Minzer Harris	19	Unknown	Unknown	Male	Black	Virginia	Electrocution	
99	October 7, 1916	Thomas Bambrick	27	26	1	Male	White	New York	Electrocution	
100	October 18, 1916	Clarence Cooley	21	21	0	Male	Black	Texas	Hanging	
101	October 20, 1916	Will Turner	Unknown	Unknown	Unknown	Male	Black	Florida	Hanging	
102	October 20, 1916	John David Wright	Unknown	Unknown	1	Male	Black	Georgia	Hanging	
103	October 20, 1916	Oscar W. White	28	25	3	Male	Black	Wyoming	Hanging	
104	October 27, 1916	Boisey Long	35	35	0	Male	Black	Florida	Hanging	
105	October 27, 1916	John Williams	35	34	1	Male	Black	Texas	Hanging	
106	November 6, 1916	Cecil Towery	22	22	0	Male	Black	Oklahoma	Electrocution	
107	November 10, 1916	Lucius C. Hightower	50	49	1	Male	White	New Mexico	Hanging	
108	November 17, 1916	Harry Garrison	20	19	1	Male	Black	Kentucky	Electrocution	
109	December 4, 1916	Stanislof Woceshoski	20	Unknown	Unknown	Male	White	Pennsylvania	Electrocution	
110	December 4, 1916	Dominick Digiso	18	17	1	Male	White	Pennsylvania	Electrocution	
111	December 11, 1916	Joseph William O'Brien	43	40	3	Male	White	Pennsylvania	Electrocution	
112	December 19, 1916	Charles Kumrow	20	Unknown	Unknown	Male	White	New York	Electrocution	
113	December 19, 1916	Stanley J. Millstein	19	18	1	Male	White	New York	Electrocution	

== Demographics ==
Gender
Male	113	100%
Female	0	0%
Ethnicity
Black	55	49%
White	44	39%
Hispanic	13	12%
Asian	1	1%
State
Pennsylvania	15	13%
New York	14	12%
North Carolina	9	8%
Texas	9	8%
Virginia	9	8%
California	7	6%
New Mexico	7	6%
Florida	6	5%
South Carolina	6	5%
Georgia	4	4%
Arizona	3	3%
Connecticut	3	3%
Wyoming	3	3%
Colorado	2	2%
Maryland	2	2%
Missouri	2	2%
West Virginia	2	2%
Alabama	1	1%
Indiana	1	1%
Kentucky	1	1%
Louisiana	1	1%
Massachusetts	1	1%
Mississippi	1	1%
New Hampshire	1	1%
New Jersey	1	1%
Oklahoma	1	1%
Tennessee	1	1%
Method
Electrocution	58	51%
Hanging	55	49%
Month
January	7	6%
February	15	13%
March	11	10%
April	6	600%
May	14	12%
June	15	13%
July	10	9%
August	9	8%
September	9	8%
October	9	8%
November	3	3%
December	5	4%
Age
Unknown	14	12%
10–19	13	12%
20–29	48	42%
30–39	27	24%
40–49	4	4%
50–59	4	4%
60–69	2	2%
70–79	0	0%
80–89	1	1%
Total	113	100%

== Executions in recent years ==
Number of executions
1917	90
1916	113
1915	132
Total	335

Preceded by 1915	List of people executed in the United States in 1916	Succeeded by 1917
