= Becks Prime =

Restaurant chain in Texas

Becks Prime Equities, Ltd.
- Trade name: Becks Prime
- Type: Private
- Industry: Restaurant
- Founded: 1985
- Headquarters: Energy Corridor, Houston, Texas, United States
- Number of locations: 10 (2025)
- Area served: Greater Houston; Dallas
- Key people: Win Campbell (CEO)
- Website: www.becksprime.com

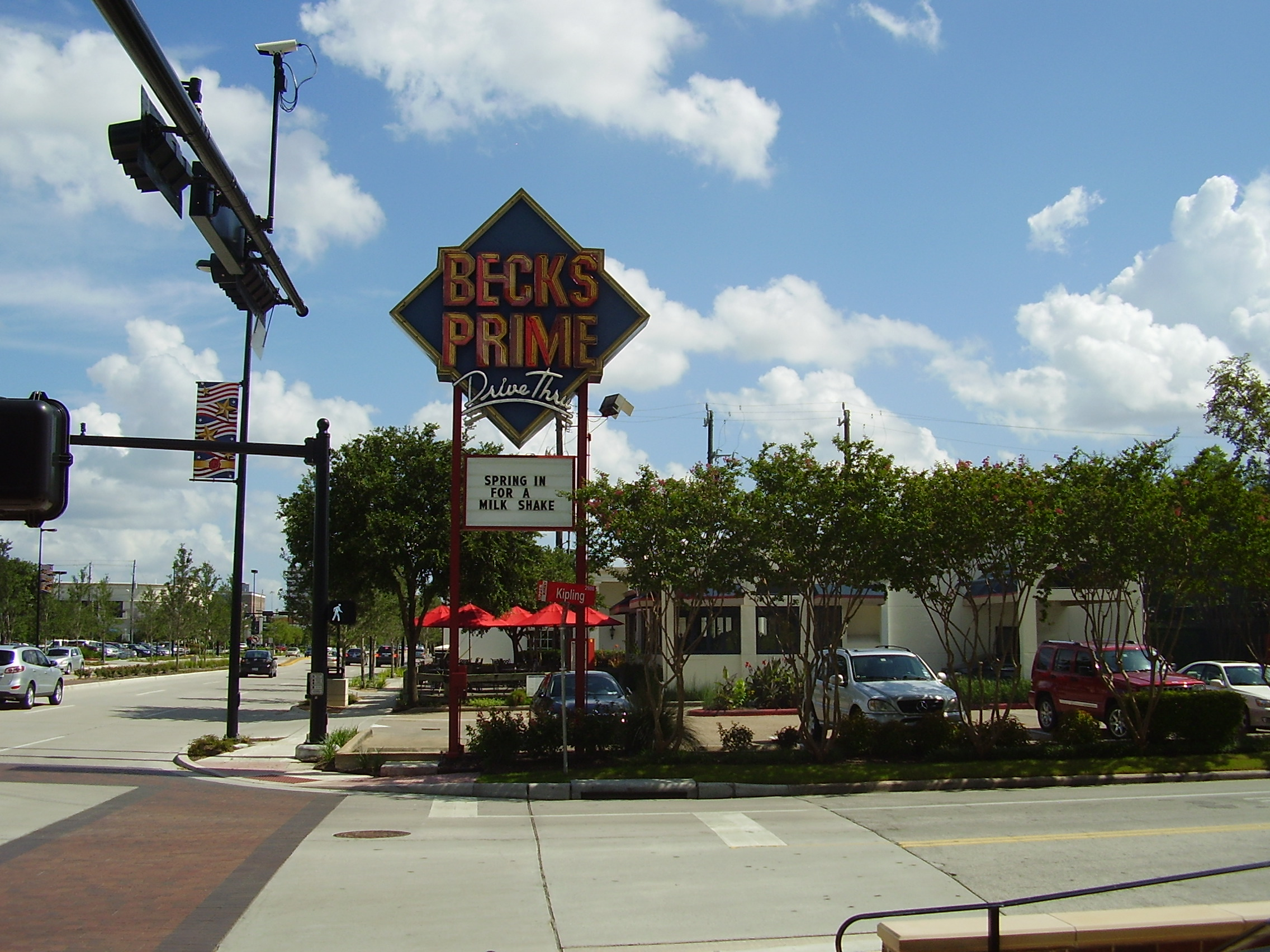
Becks Prime Kirby, the chain's first location, in Upper Kirby

Becks Prime Equities, Ltd, also known as Becks Prime Restaurants, is a gourmet hamburger restaurant chain with locations in Greater Houston, Dallas. As of 2010 Win Campbell is the chief executive officer. Its headquarters is located in the Energy Corridor area of Houston. As of January 2026, the chain has ten locations: nine locations in the Houston area (including one at the Memorial Park golf course., one in The Woodlands in Montgomery County, and one in Sugar Land in Fort Bend County), and one location in Dallas. Becks Prime has a loyalty program called "Becks Bucks" and also offers catering services.

Its original location, which opened in 1985, is along Kirby Drive in Upper Kirby in Houston. The original location was remodeled in 2008.

In 1995 Beck's Brewery pressured Becks Prime, trying to get the chain to change the name so that "Becks" would be omitted. The beer company said that it had already claimed "Becks" as a trade name. The beer company and the restaurant chain reached an agreement; Becks Prime would only use "Becks" if it had accompanying words, such as "Prime," included.

In 2008 Becks Prime announced that it would open the "Becks Prime Sportatorium" in Memorial City Mall in the Memorial City district. The 10,000 square feet (930 m^{2}) location has a bar, a conference room, table service, and a video game room. This location has closed in 2014.

== Reception ==
In the 2000s Where the Locals Eat, a national dining guide, ranked Becks Prime as one of the ten best restaurants in the United States; the publication also stated that Becks Prime served the best hamburger in Greater Houston. Becks Prime was named 2021 Best Burger in the US by Gayot.

== See also ==
- List of hamburger restaurants
