= Beer Can House =

Folk art house in Houston, Texas, U.S.

Coordinates: 29°45′49.37″N 95°25′9.24″W

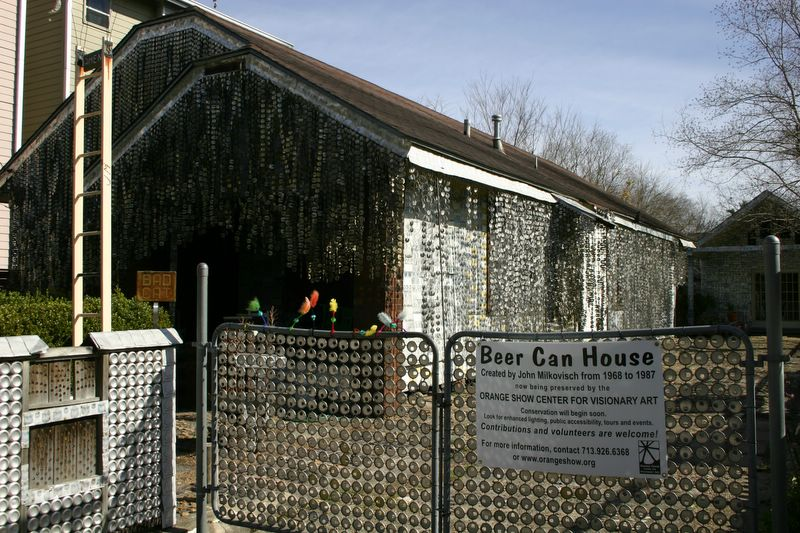
Beer Can House

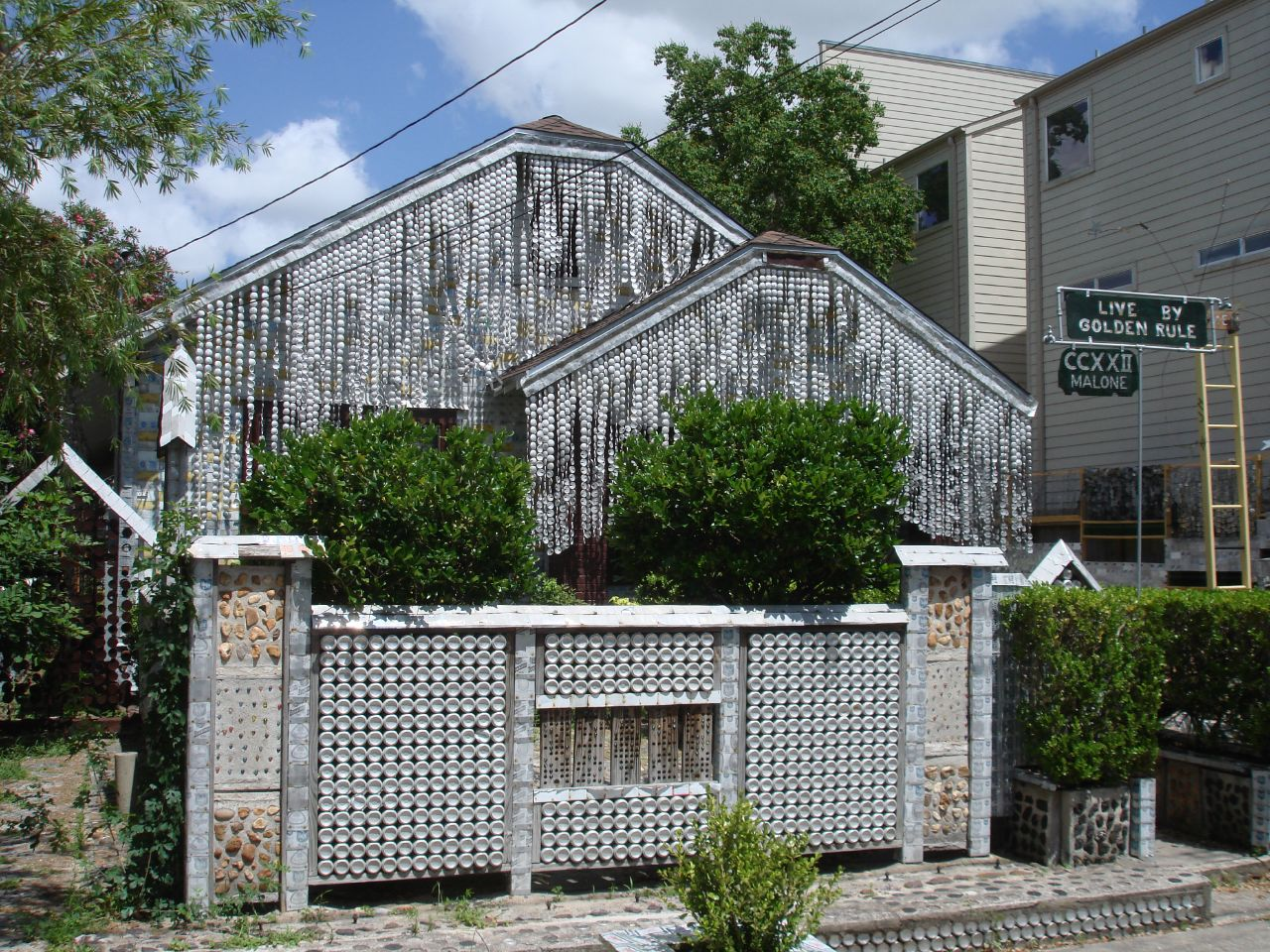
The front of the beer can house on Malone Street

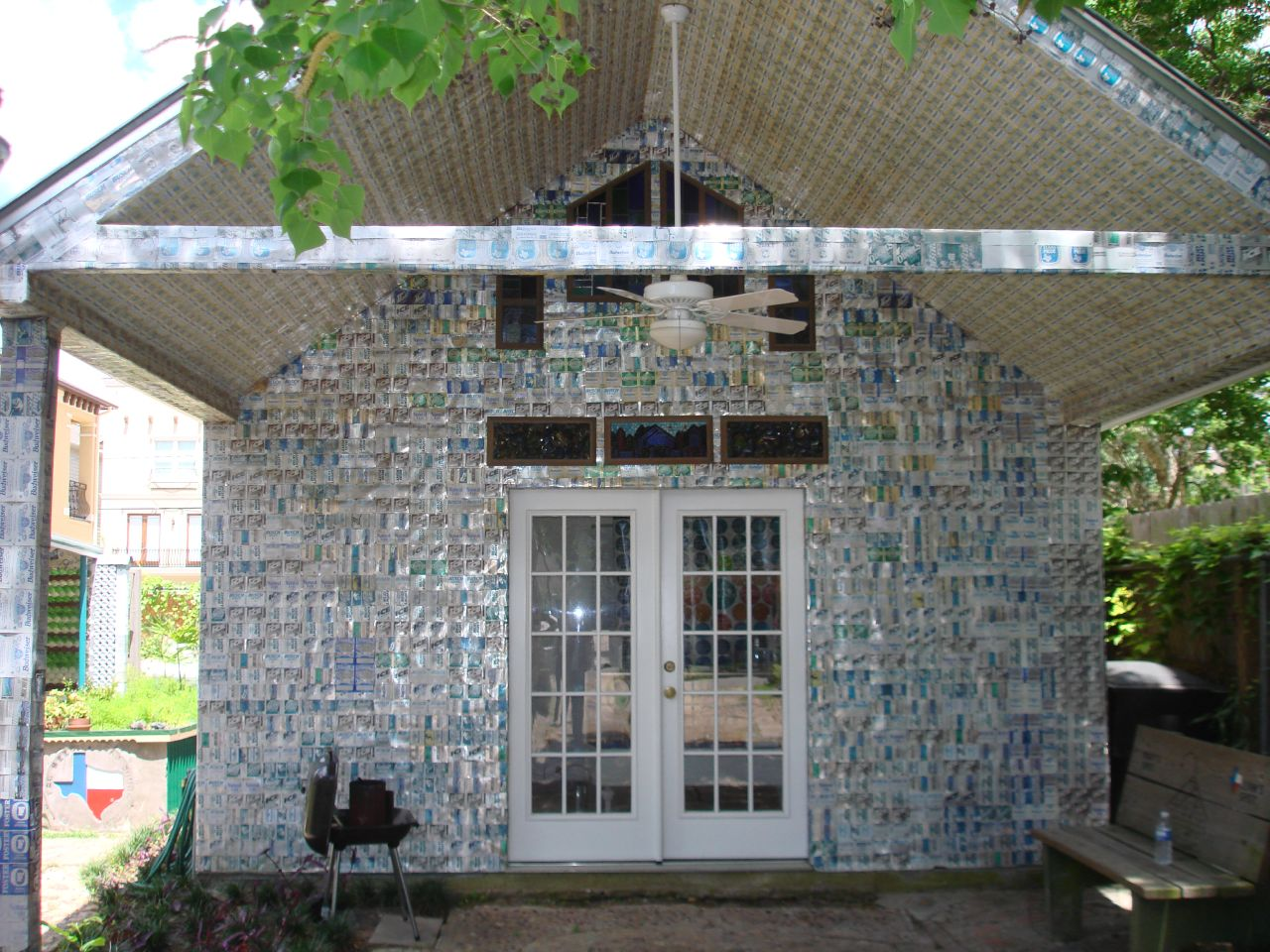
A shed at the Beer Can House showing how the walls are covered with flattened beer cans

The Beer Can House is a folk art house in Houston, Texas, that is covered with beer cans and other beer paraphernalia. The distinct appearance was created by a local railroad employee and avid beer drinker, John Milkovisch, from 1968 through the late 1980s.

== About ==
The Beer Can House is located in the neighborhood of Rice Military, at 222 Malone Street. It is covered with flattened beer cans, bottle caps, bottles, and other beer ephemera. The house is estimated to include over 50,000 beer cans. It one of Houston's most recognizable pieces of folk art.

== History ==
John Milkovisch, who worked as an upholsterer for the Southern Pacific Railroad, started creating the Beer Can House in 1968, after he covered his entire front and back yards with cement. Milkovisch inlayed pieces of rocks and metal in concrete blocks to create patios, fences, flower boxes, and other outdoor features. When asked why he did it, he simply answered, "I got sick of mowing the grass."

Milkovisch watched for beer trucks from his front porch, and visited the grocery store for beer after new deliveries arrived according to his son Ronald, who also said he "never had less than 8 to 10 cases stacked up in the garage." He particularly enjoyed Falstaff beer.

The Beer Can House is owned and operated by The Orange Show Center for Visionary Art, a non-profit organization founded in 1980 that focuses on works of extraordinary imagination and personal artistic vision. At a ribbon cutting for the project, Houston mayor Bill White praised "the hard work of generating all those beer cans" and noted that "most people who take the lead in doing something truly innovative are considered a little bit crazy".

A wall inside the structure features the following quote from Milkovisch: "They say every man should leave something to be remembered by. At least I accomplished that goal."

In March 2004, John Milkovisch was named Man of the Week on Spike TV. In 2010 comedy news site Cracked.com said, "if there's ever a vote on who the awesomest guy ever was, John Milkovisch ought to at least be on the ballot."

== See also ==
- List of public art in Houston
- Tin can wall
