= Crestwood/Glen Cove, Houston =

Community in Texas, US

Coordinates: 29.7660°N 95.4257°W

Crestwood/Glen Cove is a community in Houston, Texas. It consists of the Crestwood and Glen Cove subdivisions. The Crestwood/Glen Cove Civic Club serves the Crestwood/Glen Cove community.

== History ==
Crestwood was first developed in the 1940s. Crestwood was built on the site of Camp Logan.

In 1994 Keeter Skelton, a resident of Crestwood quoted in the Houston Chronicle, said "Everybody that moves over here stays, unless they die or for some reason they have to leave town."

== Cityscape ==
The areas under the jurisdiction of the Crestwood/Glen Cove Civic Club include Crestwood, Crestwood Acres, Glen Cove 1, Glen Cove 2, and Glen Cove 3. Crestwood/Glen Cove is east of and near to Memorial Park.

The area is also in proximity Bayou Bend, River Oaks and Avalon Place, and it is 4 miles (6.4 km) from Downtown Houston. Crestwood is within a five-minute drive to Downtown, and to The Galleria. Some houses are adjacent to the Hogg Bird Sanctuary Park. Katherine Feser of the Houston Chronicle said that the central location of Crestwood was a factor that attracted house buyers.

Crestwood is a wooded area. As of 1994 sometimes animals which live in Memorial Park, including armadillos, raccoons, and opossums, venture into Crestwood.

=== Lots and houses in Crestwood ===
Lots in Crestwood are larger than average. Lots are typically 75 feet (23 m) by 132 feet (40 m). Katherine Feser of the Houston Chronicle said that this aspect enticed house buyers to go to Crestwood. As of 1994 newer houses, built within a four-year period until 1994, include two-story brick or stucco traditional style houses. The original houses tended to be one story frame houses sided with wood. As of 1994, prices of Crestwood houses ranged from $120,000 ($260664.57 in current money) to over $500,000 ($1086102.38 in current money). In 1994 Feser said "New construction over the past four years is changing the look of the community." That year, Gale Redinbo of Redinbo Realty said that Crestwood "is going through a significant change." In 1994 Redinbo said that living in Crestwood was "like living in The Woodlands without the commute. The streets are very quiet and it's very private."

=== Lots and houses in Glen Cove ===
Glen Cove has relatively large lots. Robert Hamlin of Martha Turner Properties said that Glen Cove was one of the few neighborhoods with large lots that also has deed restrictions. The lot sizes on Glen Cove, Glenwood, Terrace, and some other streets tend to be larger, ranging from 19,000 square feet (1,800 m^{2}) to 40,000 square feet (3,700 m^{2}), while lot sizes on Blossom, Camellia, Feagan, Floyd, and Rose streets tend to be smaller.

As of 2001 Glen Cove had 173 houses. Many houses in Glen Cove were one story 1940s houses. The houses from the 1940s were built to be smaller than houses in other eras, due to a shortage of materials that occurred in that decade. On Glen Cove Street, in Glen Cove section 1, many of the houses were originally built in the 1950s and 1960s. In that era, architect Herbert Cowell had designed one of the houses in Glen Cove for himself.

As of 2001 many of the 1940s houses were increasingly being torn down and replaced by larger houses; the large lots easily accommodate the larger houses. As of 2001, mostly newly built houses on smaller lots have at minimum 3,200 square feet (300 m^{2}) of space. Houses on larger lots often have over 5,000 square feet (460 m^{2}) of space. In Glen Cove new single family houses replaced other single family houses; this contrasts from many other subdivisions from the era where, by 2001, many single-family houses were replaced with townhouses, with each single family house being replaced by multiple townhouses. Hamlin said "This is a low-density area. It's absolutely contrary to everything that's happening inside the Loop." In 2008, Lisa Gray of the Houston Chronicle said that few of the original houses on Glen Cove Street, which she said was "a neighborhood that's a magnet for expensive new development", remained and that "[m]ost of the new houses are of the steroidal, mega-mansion variety."

According to the Houston Chronicle, the typical price range of homes in Glen Cove is $600,000 - $3,200.000. The median price per square foot in 2012 was $327.01, a 0.17% change from 2011. The median price per sq. ft. in 2007 was $292.85 reflecting an average annual percent change between 2007 and 2013 of 2.2%.

== Government and infrastructure ==
The community is within Houston City Council District C. In the 2000s and the 1990s the community was in District G. It is within the City of Houston Super Neighborhood 22 - Washington Ave. / Memorial. The super neighborhood was recognized on March 6, 2000.

Harris Health System (formerly Harris County Hospital District) designated Casa de Amigos Health Center in the Near Northside for ZIP code 77007. The nearest public hospital is Ben Taub General Hospital in the Texas Medical Center.

== Education ==
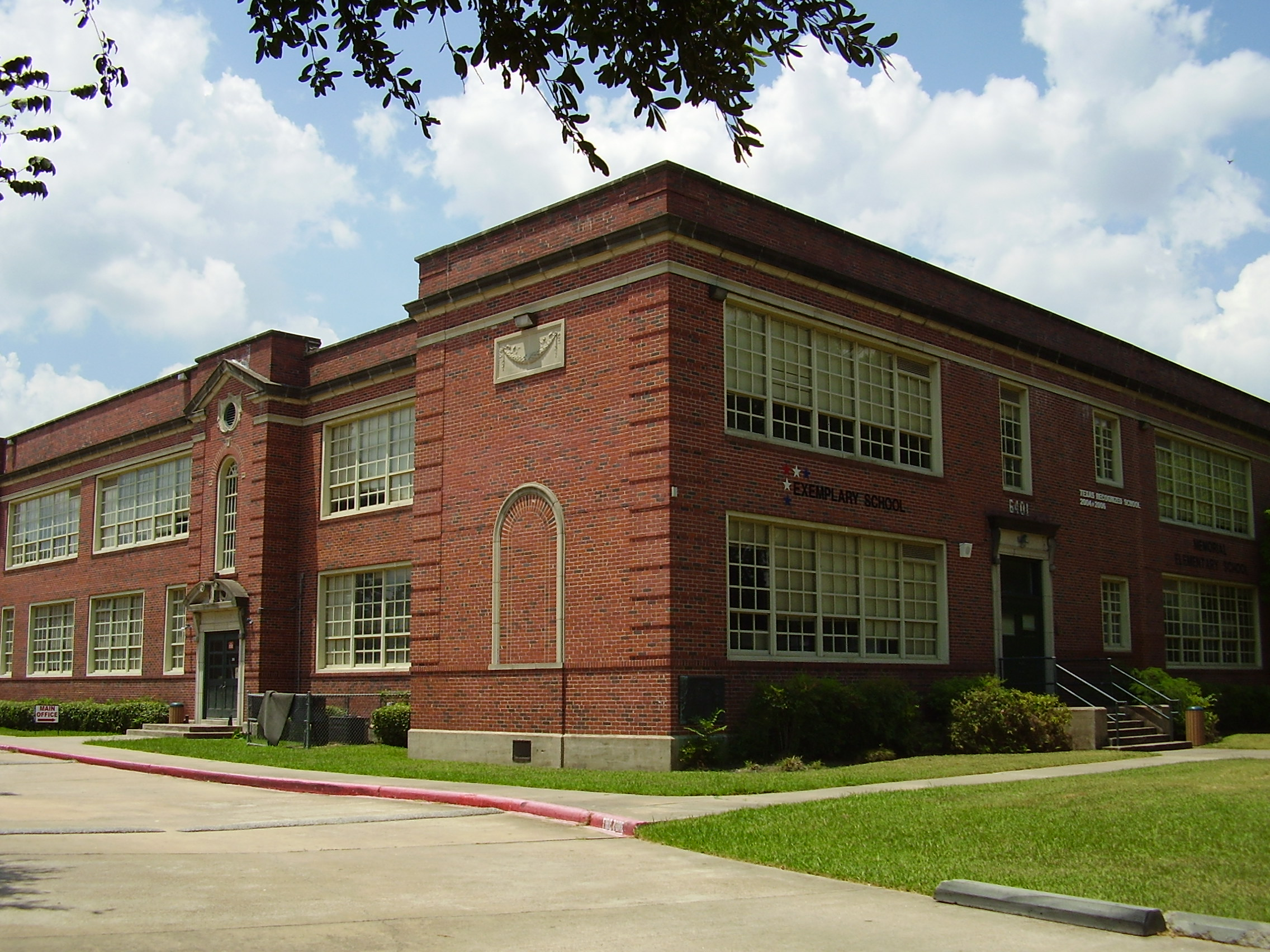
Memorial Elementary School

Residents of the entire Crestwood/Glen Cove area are within the Houston Independent School District. Residents are zoned to Memorial Elementary School, Hogg Middle School, and Lamar High School in Upper Kirby. As of 1994 many residents of Crestwood sent their children to private schools, including The Kinkaid School in Piney Point Village and St. John's School in Houston. During that year Galen Redinbo of Redinbo Realty said in regards to Crestwood that "[s]chools are probably the weak part of the neighborhood, if there is one." In 2011 the school district considered closing Memorial Elementary. The school ultimately did not close, and it instead absorbed students from the closed Stevenson Elementary School in Cottage Grove.
