= Camp Logan =

US World War I–era army training camp in Texas

Coordinates: 29°46′17″N 95°25′39″W

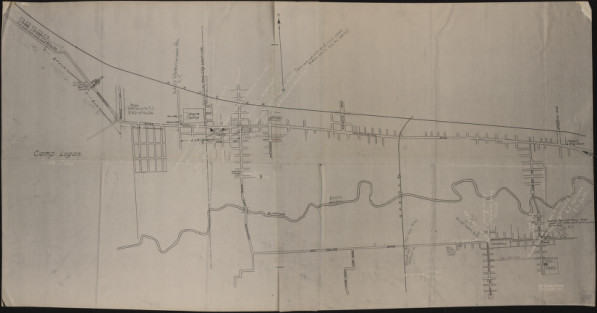
Map -- Camp Logan (circa, 1917)

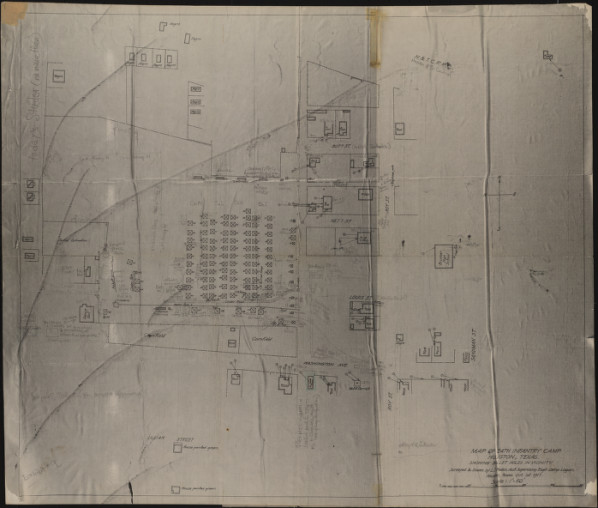
Map 24th infantry camp; Houston, Texas, showing bullet holes in vicinity (circa 1917)

Map of Buffalo Bayou area - Camp Logan Riots (circa 1917)

Camp Logan was a World War I–era army training camp in Houston, Texas, named after U.S. Senator and Civil War General John A. Logan. The site of the camp is now primarily occupied by Memorial Park where it borders the Crestwood neighborhood, near Memorial Elementary School. Some chunks of concrete, many building foundations, and extensive trenches used for training or middens still remain in the heavily forested park. Many of the trails through the park in this area trace the routes of old Camp Logan roads. One stretch of a Camp Logan road remains in original condition, that being the shell-surfaced service road to the golf course.

A map of Camp Logan as well as other resources about the camp and its history are available at the Houston Public Library in the Texas and Local History Collection, housed in the Julia Ideson building, next door to the Central Library downtown.

A historical marker in the park across the street from the school commemorates the camp, and the 1917 riot that occurred there. The marker was, initially, to be placed by the Memorial Park golf course club house. This was strongly opposed by The Friends of Memorial Park. The group felt that the marker would be better suited for location in a right of way median located at Washington Avenue and Wescott, an area that was not a part of Memorial Park. The marker was finally placed on the edge of the park at the corner of Arnot Street and Haskell.

Camp Logan was closed on March 20, 1919.

== Camp Logan 1917-1918 ==
In 1917, black soldiers at the camp were involved in the Houston Riot, a riot triggered by the belief that a fellow soldier was being unfairly incarcerated in the city of Houston.

Camp Logan also developed further notorious attention among the residents of Houston the following year as the focal point of the first widespread local outbreak of the 1918 flu pandemic. By September 24 of that year over 600 cases had been reported by the US Army surgeons at the camp, who made the fateful decision to send the sick to homes and hospitals in the community to try to protect those soldiers still healthy at the camp. By October 3 doctors reported 48 soldiers from the camp had died from the flu and it had begun to rapidly spread through the city. By October 9 the local newspapers reported that 33 flu-related deaths had now occurred in the city and that the Mayor, District Clerk, and 20 police officers had contracted. Flu cases in the city were now reported to be in the thousands and steps were being taken to put quarantines in place. Public schools, restaurants, and gatherings were shut down including the Barnum & Bailey Circus and local churches.

== Camp Logan Today ==
In recent years, Camp Logan refers to the neighborhood tucked in to the northeast corner of Memorial Park, bordered by Westcott and Arnot streets, north of Memorial Elementary School.

Remnants of the Camp Logan site are in Memorial Park.
