= Houston riot of 1917 =

Riot in response to a police assault of black soldiers

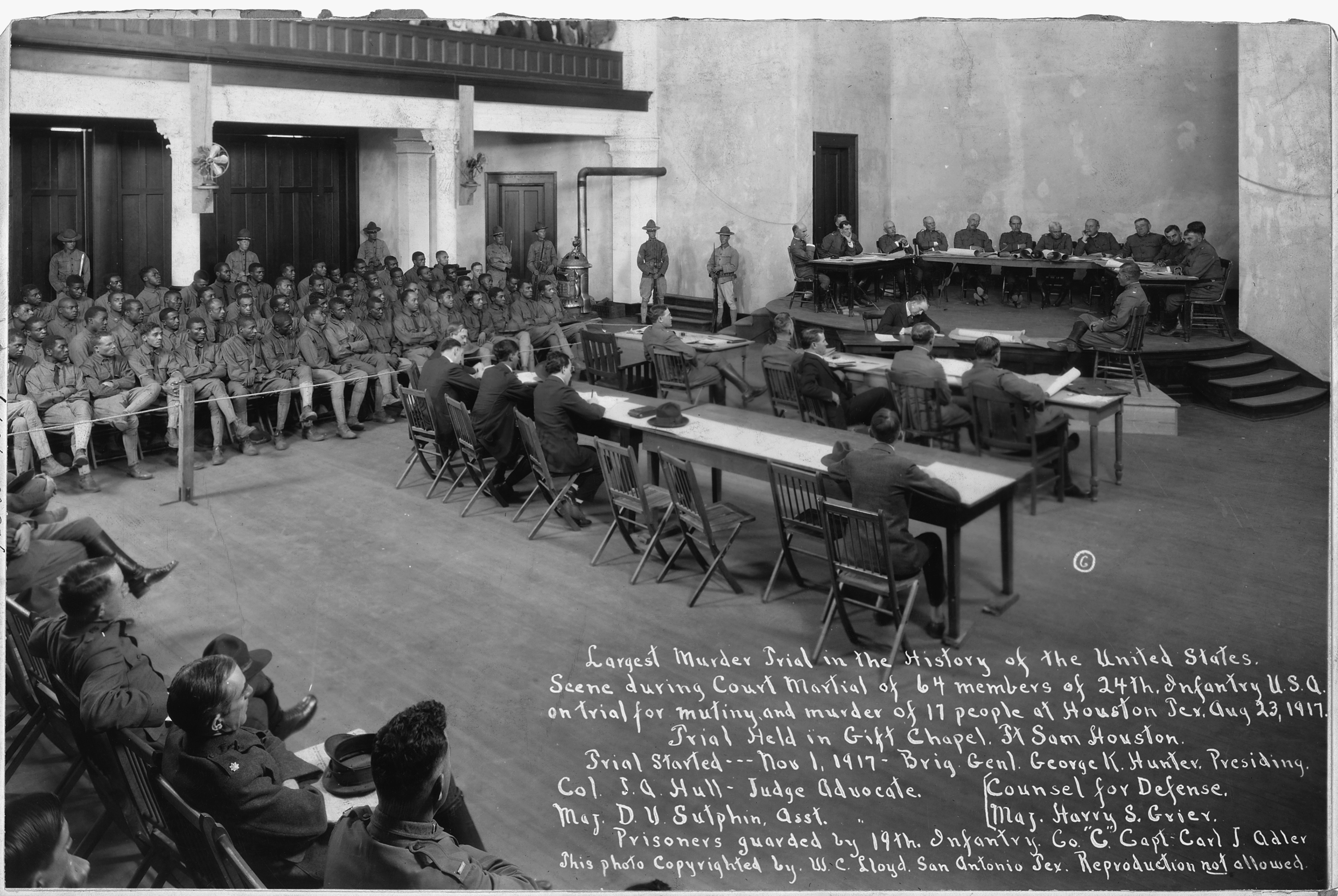
- Court Martial of 64 members of the 24th Infantry. Trial started November 1, 1917, Fort Sam Houston
- Date: August 23, 1917
- Location: Houston, Texas, U.S.

Parties
Twenty-fourth United States Infantry Regiment soldiers	Houston police

Lead figures
Sergeant Vida Henry †	General John Wilson Ruckman; Sheriff John Tobin

Casualties and losses
Deaths: Five (four killed by friendly fire during the riot and one suicide); Injuries: Arrests: 60+	Deaths: 16 (11 civilians and five policemen) unknown number of wounded
- 19 soldiers executed

A mutiny and riot by 156 soldiers from the all-black 24th Infantry Regiment of the United States Army took place on August 23, 1917, in Houston, Texas. The incident occurred within a climate of overt racist hostility from members of the all-white Houston Police Department (HPD) against members of the local black community and black soldiers stationed at Camp Logan. Following an incident where police officers arrested and assaulted black soldiers, many of their comrades mutinied and marched to Houston. There they opened fire and killed eleven civilians and five policemen. Five soldiers also died, (four to friendly fire and one to suicide). In accordance with the military laws of the time, 118 soldiers were tried in three courts-martial. This was the largest murder trial in US history. A total of 110 were convicted, of whom 19 were executed and 63 were sentenced to life imprisonment.

Gregg Andrews, author of Thyra J. Edwards: Black Activist in the Global Freedom Struggle, wrote in 2011 that the riot "shook race relations in the city and created conditions that helped to spark a statewide surge of wartime racial activism".

In November 2023, the Army set aside all 110 convictions. It acknowledged the servicemen had not received fair trials in the racist climate of the time period. The Army gave all the men honorable discharges.

== Background ==
Map of Buffalo Bayou area – Camp Logan Riots (circa 1917)

On April 6, 1917, the United States declared war on Germany, marking its official entry into World War I. The War Department initiated the construction of temporary facilities nationwide to train, house, and support troops for mobilization and deployment to Europe. Camp Logan, located west of Houston city limits, was among the newly constructed cantonments.

On July 27, 1917, soldiers from Companies I, K, L, and M of the 3rd Battalion, 24th Infantry Regiment (the 3/24th) arrived in Houston to serve as a guard detail during the construction of Camp Logan. The 3/24th was a racially segregated unit of Black American soldiers, whose regimental lineage traced back to the "Buffalo Soldiers". Members of the 3/24th sent to Houston included 654 Black enlisted soldiers and eight White commissioned officers. Prior to its arrival in Houston, the 3/24th had completed multiple tours to the Philippines during the Philippine–American War and was part of the Punitive Expedition in 1916-1917 at the Mexico–United States border during the Mexican Revolution.

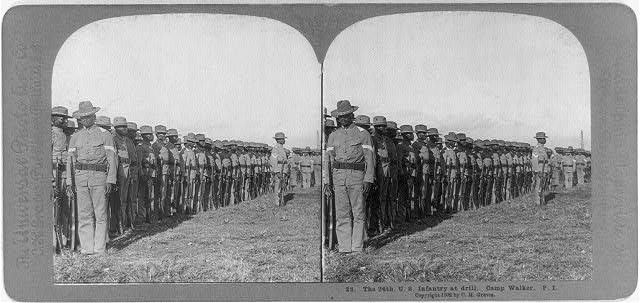
Stereograph card of the 24th Infantry Regiment at drill, Camp Walker, Philippine Islands, circa 1902.

During its time in Houston, the 3/24th was primarily led by Commanding Officer Colonel William Newman, who had been with the unit since 1915. Upon receiving a promotion, Colonel Newman relinquished command on August 21, 1917, to Major Kneeland S. Snow.

== Precipitating causes ==
Almost from their arrival, the presence of black soldiers in strictly-segregated Houston raised tensions. Jim Crow laws were in place, and the soldiers were forced to contend with segregated accommodations, including drinking facilities at the construction site, and repeated racist taunts. Prior to the riot, the soldiers were involved in a number of "clashes" with members of the all-white Houston Police Department (HPD). In several of these incidents, the police assaulted the soldiers, leaving them with lasting injuries.

Around noon of August 23, 1917, Lee Sparks and Rufus Daniels, two HPD officers, disrupted a gathering on a street corner in Houston's predominantly black San Felipe district by firing warning shots. This had been a black community since after the Civil War. Sparks, pursuing those who fled the gunshots, burst into the home of a local woman named Sara Travers. He did not find anyone he was chasing. Refusing to believe Travers's protestations that she had no knowledge of their whereabouts, Sparks dragged her outside of her house, not even allowing her to put on shoes, and arrested her.

As Sparks and Daniels called in the arrest from a patrol box, they were approached by Private Alonzo Edwards. Edwards offered to take custody of Travers, but instead was pistol-whipped repeatedly by Sparks and then arrested himself. Later that afternoon, Corporal Charles Baltimore approached Sparks and Daniels to inquire about the status of Edwards. Sparks struck Baltimore with his pistol and fired three shots at him as he fled into a nearby home. Sparks and Daniels pursued Baltimore, eventually finding him under a bed. They pulled him out, beat him, and placed him under arrest.

Rumor reached Camp Logan that police had shot and killed Baltimore. The soldiers immediately began meeting in small groups to vent their anger and eventually plot their attack against the HPD. An officer from the 24th Infantry Regiment retrieved the injured Baltimore from the police station, which seemed to calm the soldiers for the moment.

== The mutiny and riot ==
The soldiers soon received reports of impending violence by an angry white mob. Major K. S. Snow revoked all passes for the evening and ordered the guard around Camp Logan to be increased, but later that evening stumbled upon a group of men attempting to arm themselves from one of the supply tents. Snow ordered the men to assemble without arms and warned them that it was "utterly foolish, foolhardy, for them to think of taking the law into their own hands." One of the men, who had smuggled his rifle into the formation, fired it and cried out that a mob was approaching the camp. At this point, order broke down completely and the soldiers mobbed the supply tents, grabbing rifles and ammunition to take revenge.

The soldiers began firing indiscriminately into the surrounding buildings. After several minutes of shooting at Camp Logan, Sergeant Vida Henry ordered the men in the area – about 150 – to fill their canteens, grab extra ammunition, and fall in to march on Houston.

The group marched through neighborhoods on the outskirts of the city and fired at houses with outdoor lights. They fired on a car with two white occupants. They marched nearly two and a half miles, all the way to the San Felipe district, before they encountered any police officers. Due to the disorganization of the HPD and the belief that the black soldiers would be unable to arm themselves, white officers had been sent out in small numbers, expecting to quickly subdue unarmed men. The first police casualties occurred when a group of six officers stumbled upon numerous armed soldiers. The soldiers fatally shot two policemen (including Daniels), and a third later died of wounds he had sustained.

As the soldiers moved through Houston, an open-topped car carrying a man in an olive-drab uniform approached them. Believing this to be the uniform of a mounted policeman, the soldiers opened fire only to discover later that they had killed Captain Joseph W. Mattes of the Illinois National Guard. The killing of a military officer drove home the seriousness of their uprising and of the consequences faced by black men for attacking white people.

At this point, soldiers began to desert the group, and Sergeant Henry led the remainder on a march back to Camp Logan. Just outside the San Felipe district, Henry shook hands with the remaining soldiers and told them that he planned to kill himself after they left. Henry's body was found in the area the next day, with his skull crushed and a bayonet or knife wound to his shoulder.

By the time the firing ceased, 17 people were dead, including four police officers, nine civilians, and two soldiers. One soldier and a police officer later died from wounds sustained during the riot, and one soldier died from wounds sustained during his capture the next day.

== Immediate aftermath ==
The next morning, Houston was placed under martial law. The remaining soldiers at Camp Logan were disarmed, and a house-to-house search uncovered a number of soldiers hiding within the San Felipe district. Soldiers in local jails were turned over to the Army, and the 3rd Battalion was sent by train back to New Mexico.

In the ensuing court-martial, almost 200 witnesses testified over 22 days. The transcripts of the testimony amounted to more than 2000 pages. Author Robert V. Haynes suggests that the Army's Southern Department commanding general, General John Wilson Ruckman, was "especially anxious for the courts-martial to begin".

Ruckman had preferred the proceedings take place in El Paso, but eventually agreed to allow them to remain in San Antonio. Haynes posits the decision was made to accommodate the witnesses who lived in Houston, plus "the countless spectators" who wanted to follow the proceedings. Ruckman "urged" the War Department to select a "prestigious court". Three brigadier generals were chosen, along with seven full colonels and three lieutenant colonels. Eight members of the court were West Point graduates.

Ultimately, all but five of the defendants were found guilty. Thirteen soldiers were sentenced to death by hanging, 41 to life imprisonment, and four to lesser terms ranging from two to two-and-half years.

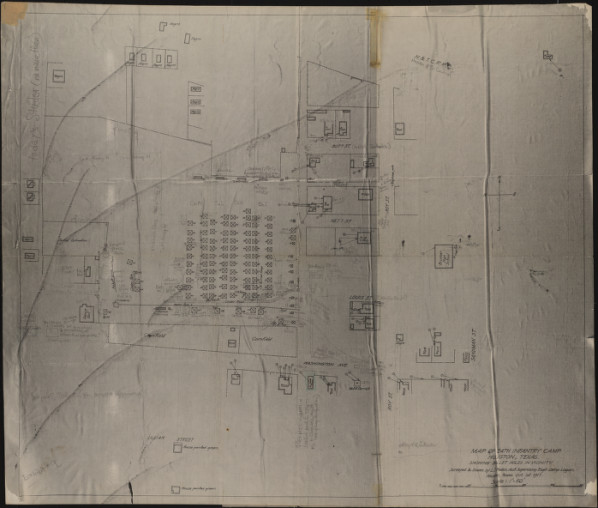
Map 24th infantry camp; Houston, Texas, showing bullet holes in the vicinity (c. 1917)

The Departmental Judge Advocate General (JAG), Colonel George Dunn, reviewed the record of the first court-martial (known as "the Nesbit Case") and approved the sentences. He forwarded the documents materials to Ruckman on December 3. Six days later, 13 of the prisoners (including Corporal Baltimore) were told that they would be hanged for murder, but they were not informed of the time or place. The court recommended clemency for a Private Hudson, but Ruckman declined to grant it.

Although 169 witnesses testified at the court-martial, the darkness and rain the night of the riot meant that many of the witnesses were unable to correctly identify any of the alleged assailants. Historians have also questioned the veracity of witness testimony, noting that some of the witnesses who testified as participants were granted immunity or promised leniency.

On September 8, 1917, Lee Sparks, the surviving officer of the two whose actions helped provoke the riot, was charged with aggravated assault against Corporal Baltimore. He was also charged with murder for shooting and killing a black man named Wallace Williams on Sunday following the riot. After being denied bail, he was held at the county jail for over a month. Sparks was eventually granted bail on October 10. On October 15, Sparks was acquitted after less than a minute of deliberation.

== The first hanging ==
The condemned soldiers (one sergeant, four corporals, and eight privates) were transferred to a barracks on December 10. That evening, trucks carried new lumber for scaffolds to some bathhouses built for the soldiers at Camp Travis near a swimming pool in the Salado Creek. The designated place of execution was several hundred yards away. Army engineers completed their work by the light of bonfires. The 13 condemned men were awakened at 5:00 am and taken to the gallows. They were hanged simultaneously, at 7:17 am, one minute before sunrise. The scaffolds were disassembled and every piece returned to Fort Sam Houston. The New York Times, commenting on the clean-up operations, observed the place of execution and place of burial were "indistinguishable." The soldiers were buried in unmarked graves by the Salado Creek, their surnames were written on paper placed in empty soda bottles that were buried with each man.

General Ruckman told reporters he had personally approved the death sentences. Forty-one soldiers had been given life sentences, and four received sentences of two and a half years or less. He said he was the one who chose the time and place for the executions. Military jurist Frederick Bernays Wiener has observed that Ruckman's approval and execution of the death sentences were "entirely legal" and "in complete conformity" with the 1916 Articles of War.

== Second and third courts-martial ==
A second court-martial, the "Washington" case, began six days later. Fifteen men of the Lower A Division were tried, and five were convicted and sentenced to death. On January 2, 1918, General Ruckman approved the sentences in a public statement. A new rule, General Orders 167 (December 29, 1917), prohibited the execution of any death sentence until the JAG could review the sentences. (The JAG Boards of Review to review death sentences were created by a subsequent rule, General Orders 7, on January 7, 1918. The boards, though they had advisory power only, were the Army's first appellate courts.)

While waiting for the JAG review to occur, General Ruckman approved a third court-martial, the "Tillman" case, of 40 more soldiers. On March 26, 1918, 23 of the 40 were found guilty. Eleven of the 23 were sentenced to death and the remaining 12 to life in prison. On May 2, General Ruckman approved the sentences.

== President Wilson's clemency and commentary ==
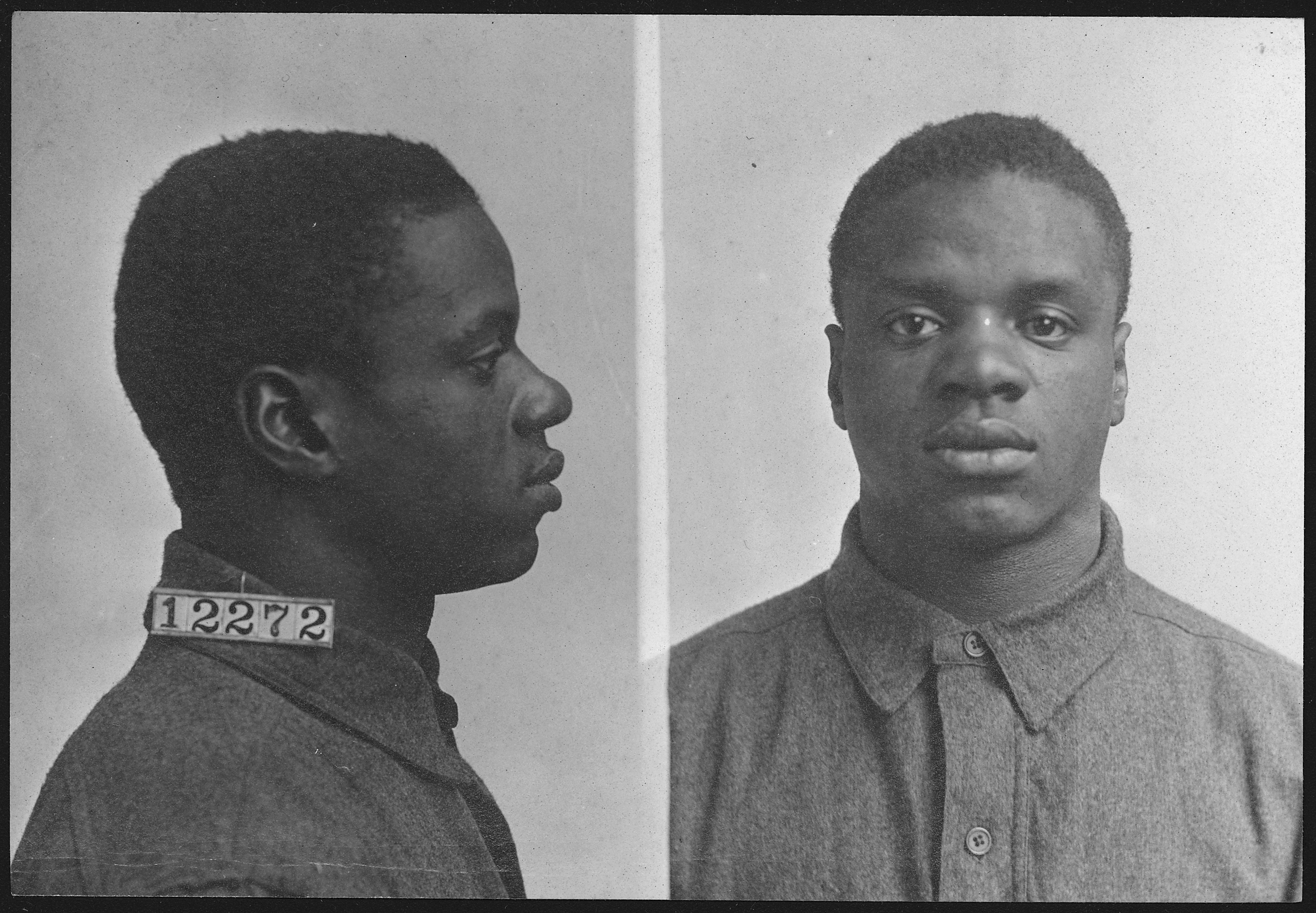
Private LeRoy Pinkett, convicted of murder, mutiny, and assault with intent to murder in the Nesbit case. Sentenced to life imprisonment, he was released on parole in 1927.

On August 31, 1918, President Woodrow Wilson commuted the death sentences of ten soldiers to life in prison. Wilson issued a rare public statement in order that the basis of his action might be "a matter of record."

The President's statement began by recounting the events that led to the deaths of "innocent bystanders" who were "peaceably disposed civilians of the City of Houston." He noted the investigations that followed were "very searching and thorough", in the fashion of most investigations involving alleged attacks by black citizens. In each of the three proceedings, the court was promised to be "properly constituted" and composed of "officers of experience and sobriety of judgment." Wilson also noted that "extraordinary precautions" were taken to "insure the fairness of the trials" and, in each instance, the rights of the defendants were "surrounded at every point" by the "safeguards" of "a humane administration of the law." As a result, technically there were "no legal errors" that had "prejudiced the rights of the accused."

Wilson stated that he affirmed the death sentences of six soldiers because there was "plain evidence" that they "deliberately" engaged in "shocking brutality." On the other hand, he commuted the remaining sentences because he believed the "lesson" of the lawless riot had already been "adequately pointed." He desired the "splendid loyalty" of African-American soldiers be recognized and expressed the hope that clemency would inspire them "to further zeal and service to the country." Of the six condemned soldiers not spared by Wilson, five were executed at Fort Sam Houston on September 17, 1918. The sixth, Private William D. Boone, was executed at Fort Sam Houston on September 24, 1918.

Most importantly from the Army's viewpoint, Wilson (a former law professor) wrote that the actions taken by the former Commander of the Southern Department were "legal and justified by the record." The President agreed that "a stern redress" of the rioters' "wrongs" was the "surest protection of society against their further recurrence". But as historian Calvin C. Smith noted in 1991, there was no proof of a "conspiracy", and many of the sentenced were not conclusively identified in the dark and rainy night as having even participated in the riot, despite the government's pledge of fair trials and absolute transparency.

== Release and rehabilitation ==
On December 14, 1924, four of the rioters, including future Negro league baseball player Roy Tyler, were released on parole; 34 remained imprisoned in Fort Leavenworth. On March 8, 1927, President Calvin Coolidge reduced the sentences for the last 20 imprisoned rioters, making them eligible for parole within one year.

In 1937, the remains of the 13 executed soldiers were exhumed from their unmarked graves and reburied with military headstones in Fort Sam Houston National Cemetery. In 1938, President Franklin D. Roosevelt ordered the release of the last 3-5 rioters still in prison.

On November 13, 2023, the Army set aside the convictions of the 110 soldiers. "After a thorough review, the Board has found that these Soldiers were wrongly treated because of their race and were not given fair trials," said Secretary of the Army Christine Wormuth. "By setting aside their convictions and granting honorable discharges, the Army is acknowledging past mistakes and setting the record straight."

== Camp Logan site today ==
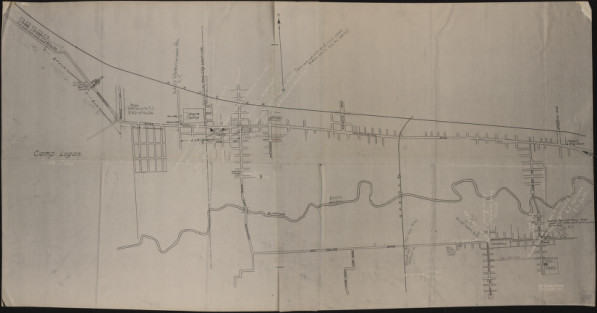
Map – Camp Logan (circa, 1917)

Much of the site of Camp Logan is now located within Houston's Memorial Park, with the Memorial Park golf course occupying the area that was the center of the camp.

== In popular culture ==
- The hanging of the first 13 soldiers is mentioned in part 4 of the 1979 television miniseries Roots: The Next Generations.
- James McEachin wrote a novel, Farewell to the Mockingbirds: A Novel (1997), about the riot and its aftermath; Rharl Publishing Group.
- KHOU, a CBS-affiliated TV station located in Houston, produced a documentary of the riot in 2006 entitled Mutiny on the Bayou: The Camp Logan Story.
- The 24th, a movie about the riot, was filmed partly in the Brooklyn-South Square section of Salisbury, North Carolina in June 2019
- Fire and Movement (2019) is a commissioned public performance by interdisciplinary Chicago-based artist Jefferson Pinder
- Jaime Salazar wrote an updated account of the mutiny and courts martial, Mutiny of Rage (2021), published by Rowman & Littlefield

== See also ==
- Capital punishment by the United States military
- 1917 in the United States
- Woodrow Wilson and race
- History of the African-Americans in Houston
- Turner W. Bell – famous black lawyer who defended some of the soldiers
- Military history of African Americans
- List of incidents of civil unrest in the United States
- Anti-white racism
