= CCHS =

CCHS may refer to:

== Medical ==
- Congenital central hypoventilation syndrome, a disorder that results in respiratory arrest during sleep

== Societies ==
- Carleton County Historical Society, New Brunswick, Canada
- Columbia County Historical Society, New York, United States

== Schools ==
=== Canada ===
- Carver Christian High School, Burnaby, British Columbia

=== United Kingdom ===
England

- Carlisle and County High School for Girls (former grammar school), now Richard Rose Central Academy
- Chatsmore Catholic High School, Goring-by-Sea, Worthing, West Sussex
- Chelmsford County High School for Girls, Chelmsford, Essex
- Clacton County High School, Clacton-on-Sea, Essex
- Codsall Community High School, Codsall, Staffordshire
- Colchester County High School for Girls, Colchester, Essex
- Cramlington Learning Village, Cramlington, Northumberland

=== United States ===
- Allentown Central Catholic High School, Pennsylvania
- Camden Catholic High School, Cherry Hill, New Jersey
- Cañon City High School, Cañon City, Colorado
- Carroll County High School (Virginia)
- Cathedral Catholic High School, San Diego, California
- Central Cabarrus High School, Concord, North Carolina
- Charleston Catholic High School, West Virginia
- Charlotte Catholic High School, Charlotte, North Carolina
- Cherry Creek High School, Greenwood Village, Colorado
- Chicago Christian High School, Palos Heights, Illinois
- Chicopee Comprehensive High School, Chicopee, Massachusetts
- Chilton County High School, Clanton, Alabama
- Christopher Columbus High School (Miami-Dade County), Florida
- Clarke Central High School, Athens, Georgia
- Clarke County High School (Berryville, Virginia), Berryville, Virginia
- Clay-Chalkville High School, Clay, Alabama
- Coal City High School, Illinois
- Colleton County High School, Walterboro, South Carolina
- Colonie Central High School, Colonie, New York
- Colquitt County High School, Georgia
- Communitas Charter High School, San Jose, California
- Concord-Carlisle High School, Concord, Massachusetts
- Conley-Caraballo High School, Hayward, California
- Cooper City High School, Cooper City, Florida
- Copper Canyon High School, Glendale, Arizona
- Corner Canyon High School, Draper, Utah
- Covenant Christian High School (Michigan)
- Covington Catholic High School, Park Hills, Kentucky
- Crimson Cliffs High School, Washington, Utah
- Cross Creek High School, Augusta, Georgia
- Cross County High School, Cross County, Arkansas
- Culpeper County High School, Culpeper, Virginia
- Culver City High School, Culver City, California
- Culver Community High School, Culver, Indiana
- Wheeling Central Catholic High School, Wheeling, West Virginia
- Carbondale Community High School, Carbondale, Illinois
- Culpeper County High School, Culpeper, Virginia

== See also ==
- Campbell County High School (disambiguation)
- Catholic Central High School (disambiguation)
- CCH (disambiguation)
- Central Catholic High School (disambiguation)
- Chung Cheng High School (disambiguation)
- Clear Creek High School (disambiguation)
- Columbus High School (disambiguation)
- Cypress Creek High School (disambiguation)
