= Cypress Creek =

Cypress Creek may refer to:

== United States ==
- Cypress Creek station, a rail station in Fort Lauderdale, Florida
- Cypress Creek (Logan Creek tributary), a stream in Missouri
- Cypress Creek (Texas), a stream in Waller County, Texas
- Cypress Creek EMS, an emergency medical service provider in Houston, Texas
- Cypress Creek High School (disambiguation)
- Cypress Creek National Wildlife Refuge, Illinois
- Cypress Creek (Pagan River tributary), tributary of the Pagan River in Virginia
- Cypress Creek Preserve, a 7,400-acre park in Land o' Lakes, Pasco County, Florida
- Cypress Creek Preserve, Pasco County, a 255-acre area of protected land in Wesley Chapel, Pasco County, Florida
- Cypress Creek Town Center, Wesley Chapel, Florida
- Little Cypress Creek Bridge, Phillips County, Arkansas

== Fictional ==
- Cypress Creek, a fictional place as seen on The Simpsons episode "You Only Move Twice"
