= Geography of Houston =

A true-color image of Greater Houston.

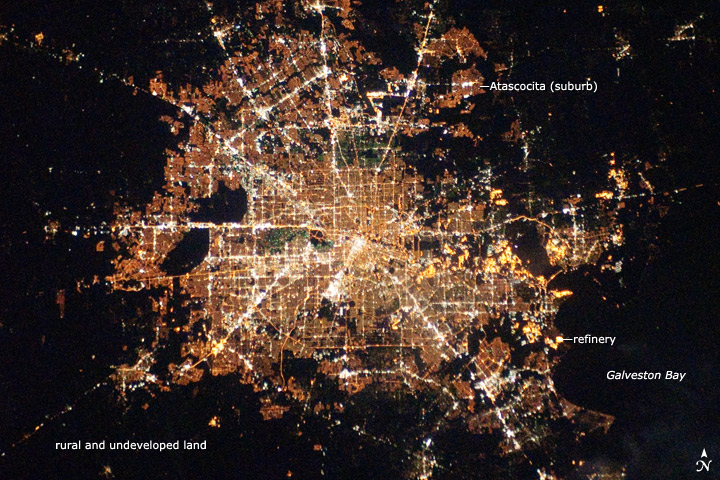
Astronaut photograph of Houston at night.

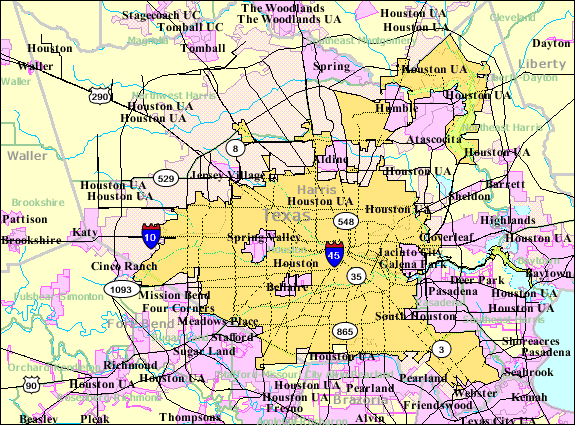
Map of the Houston city limits

Houston, the most populous city in the Southern United States, is located along the upper Texas Gulf Coast, approximately 50 miles (80 km) northwest of the Gulf of Mexico at Galveston. The city, which is the ninth-largest in the United States by area, covers 601.7 square miles (1,558 km^{2}), of which 579.4 square miles (1,501 km^{2}), or 96.3%, is land and 22.3 square miles (58 km^{2}), or 3.7%, is water.

Houston is located in the Gulf Coastal Plain biome, and its vegetation is classified as temperate grassland. Much of the city was built on marshes, forested land, swamp, or prairie, all of which can still be seen in surrounding areas.

The city's topography is very flat, making flooding a recurring problem for its residents. The city stands about 50 feet (15 m) above sea level—the highest area within city limits being 90 feet (27 m). However, subsidence, caused by extensive groundwater pumping and resource extraction, has caused the elevation to drop 10 feet (3.0 m) or more in certain areas. As a result, the city turned to surface water sources for its municipal supply, creating reservoirs such as Lake Houston and Lake Conroe (of which Houston owns two-thirds interest).

Houston has four major bayous passing through the city: Buffalo Bayou, which runs into downtown and the Houston Ship Channel; and three of its tributaries: Brays Bayou, which runs along the Texas Medical Center; White Oak Bayou, which runs through the Heights and near the northwest area; and Sims Bayou, which runs through the south of Houston and downtown Houston. The ship channel goes past Galveston and into the Gulf of Mexico.

Houston is located 165 miles (266 km) east of Austin, 112 miles (180 km) west of the Louisiana border, and 250 miles (400 km) south of Dallas. Houston County, Texas, located 100 miles (160 km) north of Houston, is unrelated to Houston.

== Geology ==
Houston is largely located within the Northern Humid Gulf Coast Prairies level IV ecoregion (34a), a subset of the Western Gulf coastal grasslands level III region as defined by the United States Environmental Protection Agency. This region is generally underlaid by Quaternary-aged sand, silts, and clays (clay, clay loam, or sandy clay loam) and covered by grasslands with occasional clusters of oak trees.

The land surface in and around the city of Houston is composed of alternating layers of red, gray, sandy brown, and black organic clay; these strata generally dip to the southeast at a slope of 0.06% (3 feet (0.91 m) of vertical change for every 1 mile (1.6 km) of distance traveled). These soils were deposited by tributaries of local waterways, particularly the Brazos and Trinity rivers. There is a considerable contrast in soil composition to the north around Cypress Creek; most of the surface there consists of tan-colored sand with small amounts of gray clay. The north and northwestern regions of Houston and Harris County feature a slightly steeper slope than other parts of the city, with occasional escarpments caused by faulting or erosion.

The sedimentary layers underneath Houston ultimately extend down some 60,000 feet (18,000 m), with the oldest beds deposited during the Cretaceous. Between 30,000 feet (9,100 m) and 40,000 feet (12,000 m) below the surface is a layer of salt, the primary source of salt domes that dot the metropolitan area. Since salt is more buoyant than other sediments, it rises to the surface, creating domes and anticlines and causing subsidence due to its removal from its original strata. These structures manage to capture oil and gas as it percolates through the subsurface; Pierce Junction is a notable example of a heavily drilled salt dome oil field in Houston.

=== Seismic activity ===
The Houston region is generally earthquake-free, despite the presence of 86 mapped and historically active surface faults with an aggregate length of 149 miles (240 km). This includes the Long Point–Eureka Heights fault system which runs through the center of the city. No significant historically recorded earthquakes have occurred in Houston, but researchers do not discount the possibility of such quakes having occurred in the deeper past, or occurring in the future.

Land subsidence has occurred across Greater Houston, primarily due to the pumping of water from subsurface aquifers (see Groundwater section). This subsidence may also be associated with slip along the faults; however, the slippage is slow and not considered an earthquake, in which stationary faults must slip suddenly enough to create seismic waves. The clay below the surface precludes the buildup of friction that produces ground shaking in earthquakes. As a result, faults generally move at a smooth rate in what is termed fault creep. The recently built Premium Outlet Mall and newly renovated US 290 have experienced the slippage of the Hockley Fault, which was redefined as being farther east than previously mapped.

== Surface water ==
=== Rivers ===
Houston, often popularly referred to as the Bayou City, is crossed by a number of slow-moving, swampy rivers, which are essential to draining the region's broad floodplains. The city was founded at the convergence of Buffalo Bayou and White Oak Bayou, a point today known as Allen's Landing.

Buffalo Bayou is the longest and largest of the bayous which flow through Houston, following a 53-mile (85 km) route from Katy through Memorial, Rice Military, Downtown, the East End, Denver Harbor, and Channelview before meeting the San Jacinto River at Galveston Bay. The broad eastern stretch of the river, known as the Houston Ship Channel, plays an essential role in the Port of Houston and is home to one of the largest petrochemical refining complexes in the United States. Buffalo Bayou's environs are also home to significant amounts of parkland, including linear parks such as Terry Hershey Park and Buffalo Bayou Park which serve as corridors for walking and bicycling.

White Oak Bayou, a major tributary of the Buffalo, has its source in Jersey Village and travels 25 miles (40 km) southeast, through Inwood Forest, Oak Forest, and Houston Heights. Brays Bayou, another major tributary to the south, originates near Mission Bend and travels 31 miles (50 km) through Alief, Sharpstown, Meyerland, Braeswood Place, the Texas Medical Center, Riverside Terrace, and the East End before meeting Buffalo Bayou at Harrisburg.

Two more significant tributaries of Buffalo Bayou flow through parts of Houston outside the Interstate 610 loop. Greens Bayou, which originates in far northwest Houston near Willowbrook, flows for 43 miles (69 km) through Greenspoint and undeveloped areas of northeastern Harris County. Sims Bayou, which has its source near Missouri City southwest of Houston, flows for 23 miles (37 km) past Almeda, Sunnyside, South Park, and Manchester.

Houston's topography is further defined by a large number of creeks and ditches. Overall, this intricate system of waterways is essential to flood control; Houston is well known as one of the most flood-prone cities in the United States. Since the mid-20th century, the United States Army Corps of Engineers, in cooperation with the city and Harris County Flood Control District, has channelized, paved, widened, and deepened extensive sections of all of the five major bayous specified above, with the notable exception of some parts of the Buffalo near Memorial. The Buffalo Bayou watershed also features two flood control reservoirs, Addicks Reservoir and Barker Reservoir, which retain large amounts of water after extreme rainfall events.

Cypress Creek drains a significant portion of northern Harris County. The river flows for 52 miles (84 km) through the suburban areas of Cypress and Spring before joining the San Jacinto River. The creek's watershed, which covers 310 square miles (800 km^{2}), is one of the largest in the county.

The Brazos River straddles some of Houston's extreme western and southwestern suburbs, particularly Sugar Land and Rosenberg.

=== Water bodies ===
Houston contains few naturally formed lakes. Lake Houston, an 11,854-acre (4,797-hectare) reservoir located approximately 15 miles (24 km) northeast of Downtown, was created by damming the San Jacinto River in the 1950s to create a dependable, long-term supply of drinking water. The lake is owned and operated by the City of Houston. Besides supplying water to the city, the lake is also a central feature of the Kingwood community and serves as a recreational destination.

Galveston Bay is a central feature of the Greater Houston metropolitan area. The bay serves an essential economic role as the home of the Houston Ship Channel and a large fishing industry and is also an important destination for recreation and coastal wildlife. Covering approximately 600 square miles (1,600 km^{2}), the estuary extends 30 miles (48 km) inland from the coast and has a maximum width of 17 miles (27 km). Important regional communities, including Galveston and Texas City, are located along the bay. While the City of Houston proper does not adjoin the bay, its limits do extend southward to encompass the NASA Johnson Space Center and the community of Clear Lake.

Clear Lake, which gives the aforementioned community its name, is a tidal lake with brackish water located on the western side of Galveston Bay. Covering about 2,000 acres (810 hectares), the lake is fed by Clear Creek and inflow from the bay. Ultimately, the Clear Creek watershed covers an area of 250 square miles (650 km^{2}) encompassing seventeen tributaries.

== Groundwater ==
Two freshwater aquifers, the Chicot and Evangeline, underlie the Greater Houston area. These aquifers are composed mostly of sand and clay. The Chicot is located above the Evangeline, and a confining layer separates them from the Jasper aquifer below, which is mostly saltwater. A majority of drinking water supply wells in Houston are drilled to depths between 1,000 feet (300 m) and 2,000 feet (610 m).

Extraction of water, oil, and gas from these aquifers has caused land subsidence throughout the Greater Houston region since the early 20th century. Before 1942, Houston's municipal water supply was sourced exclusively from groundwater wells. The inception of the petroleum industry at the beginning of the century also led to widespread resource extraction around the city. Surface elevations began to drop with the water table, and by the 1970s, areas around the Houston Ship Channel had subsided up to 7 feet (2.1 m) due to rapid industrialization, prompting the creation of the Harris–Galveston Coastal Subsidence District. By the end of the decade, subsidence had intensified to 10 feet (3.0 m) in some parts of east Houston, and 3,200 square miles (8,300 km^{2}) of the region had experienced at least 1 foot (0.30 m) of sinking.

The creation of the district, which enforced a transition from ground to surface water consumption, effectively halted subsidence in the most severe areas near the Ship Channel; aquifer recharge has helped water table elevations return to normal. However, in the northwestern region of the city, groundwater levels – and, concurrently, land surface elevations – continue to decline.

== Cityscape ==
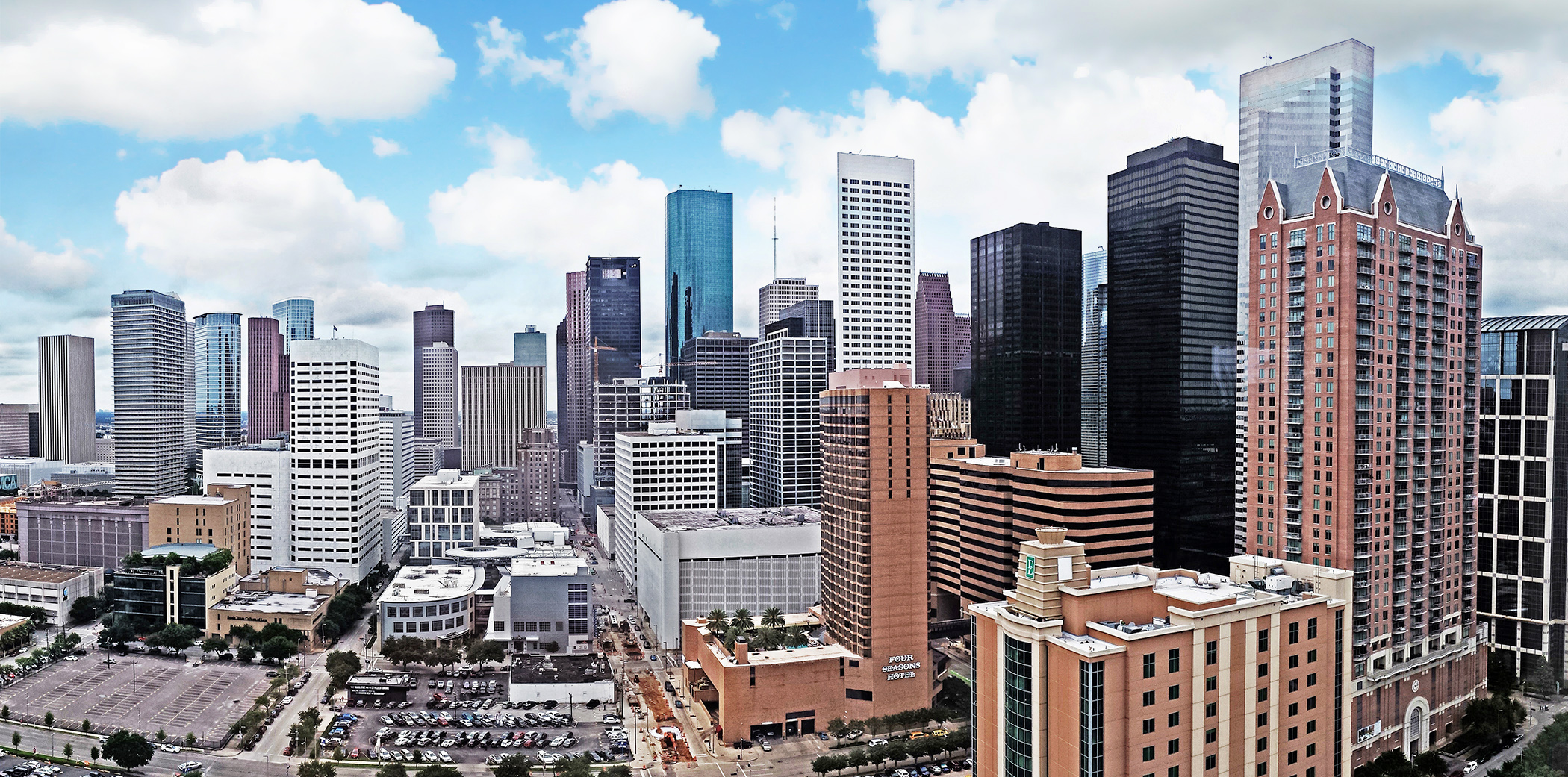
Downtown Houston

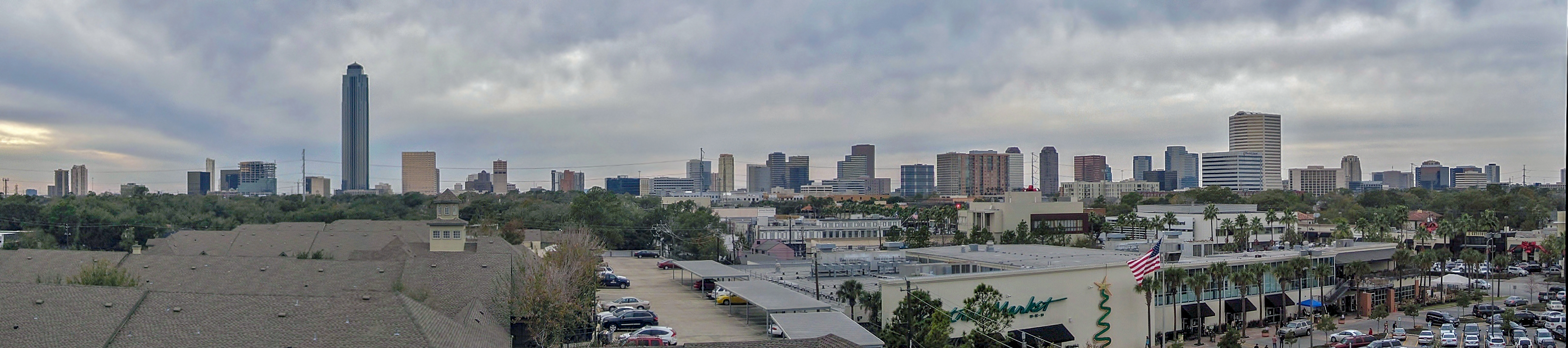
Uptown Houston

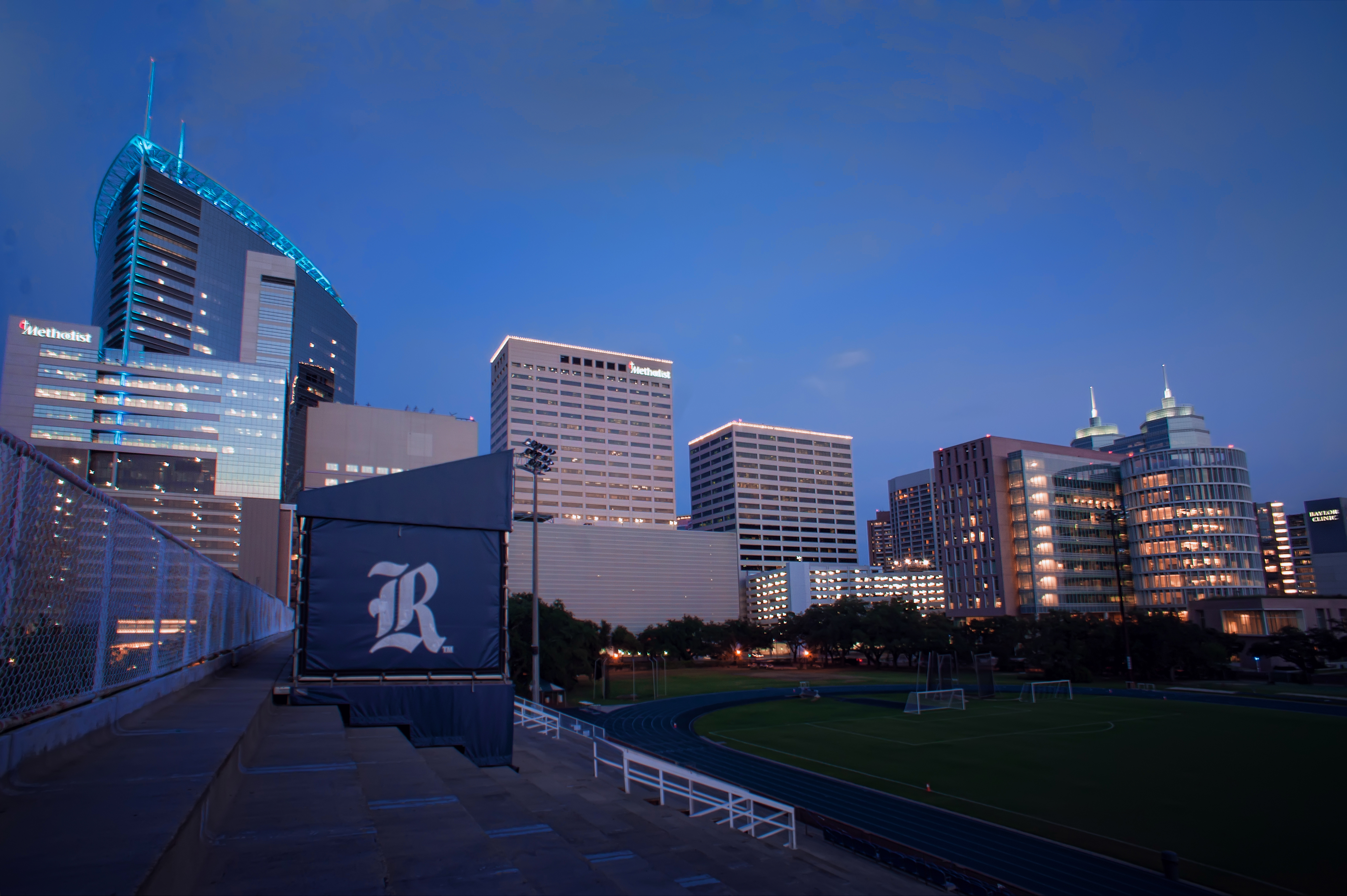
Texas Medical Center

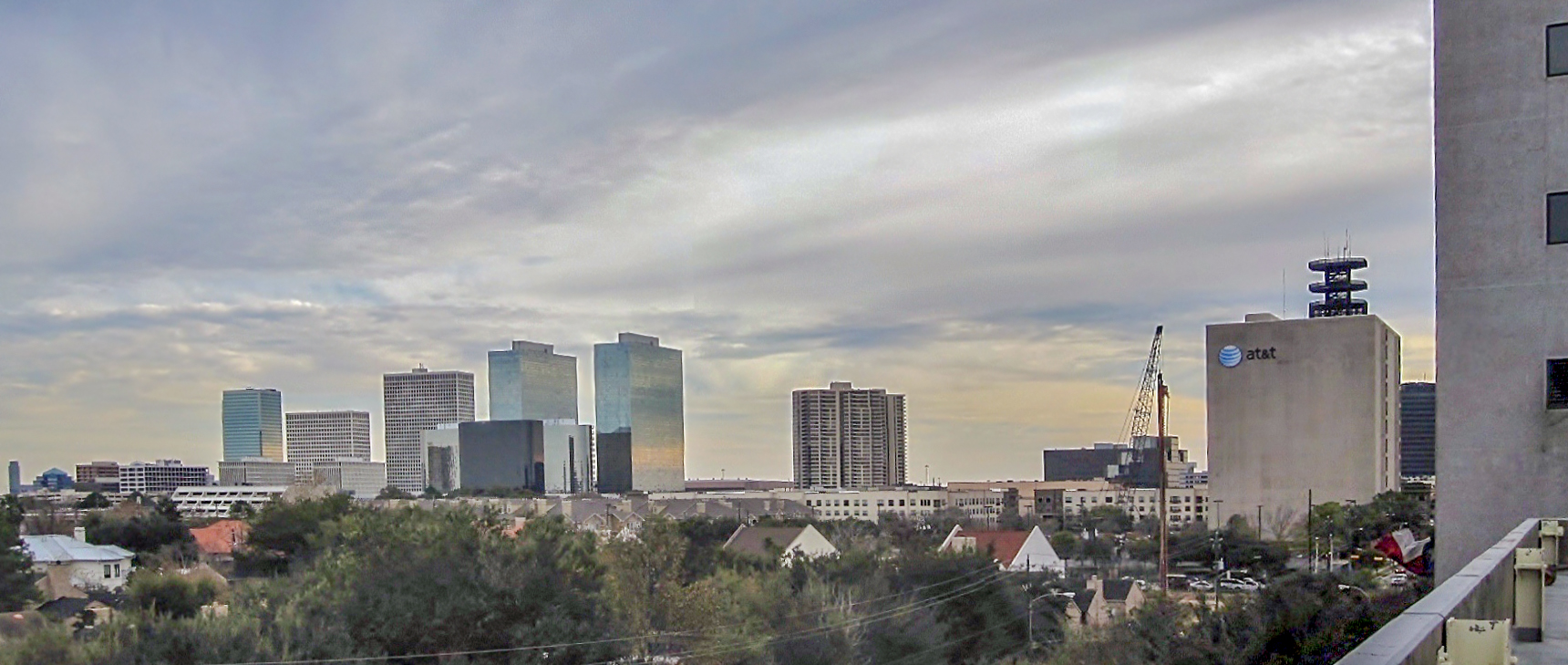
Greenway Plaza

When Houston was established in 1837, the city's founders—John Kirby Allen and Augustus Chapman Allen—divided it into political geographic districts called "wards." The ward designation is the progenitor of the current-day Houston City Council districts—there are nine in all.

Locations in Houston are generally classified as either being inside or outside Interstate 610, known as the "610 Loop" or simply "The Loop". Inside the loop generally encompasses the central business district, and has come to define an urban lifestyle and state of mind. Elizabeth Long, the author of the 2003 book Book Clubs: Women and the Uses of Reading in Everyday Life, wrote that most of the upper middle classes in the 610 Loop live in the southwestern part of the inner city in the areas near Hermann Park, the Houston Museum District, Rice University, and the Texas Medical Center, while some portions of northern Houston and Eastern Houston have been gentrified and also have upper middle classes.

The outlying areas of Houston, the airports, and the city's suburbs and enclaves are outside the Loop. Another ring road, Beltway 8 (also known simply as the "Beltway" or as the "Sam Houston Tollway"), encircles the city another 5 miles (8 km) farther out. Parts of Beltway 8 are toll roads, but for most of the route, motorists can drive in the adjacent "feeder" or service roads at no charge. Farm to Market Road 1960 (FM 1960) forms a semicircle in northern Houston and is another dividing line. The third ring road, State Highway 99 (also known as the Grand Parkway), is under construction. Long stated that most of the wealthier Houston suburbs are west and north of the central city, while to the southeast the Clear Lake/NASA "[represents] another burgeoning concentration of largely aerospace-related prosperity".

Houston, being the largest city in the United States without zoning laws, has grown in an unusual manner. Rather than a single "downtown" as the center of the city's employment, five additional business districts have grown throughout the inner city—they are Uptown, Texas Medical Center, Greenway Plaza, Westchase, and Greenspoint. If these business districts were combined, they would form the third-largest downtown in the United States. The city also has the third-largest skyline in the country (after New York City and Chicago), but because it is spread over a few miles, pictures of the city show—for the most part—the main downtown area. The growth of the Greater Houston area has occurred from all directions from the city core.

== See also ==
- Geographic areas of Houston
