= JKCS =

JKCS may refer to:

- John Keells IT, the current name of John Keells Computer Services
- John Knox Christian School
- JKCS 041
