= Oregon State Police =

State police agency for the U.S. state of Oregon

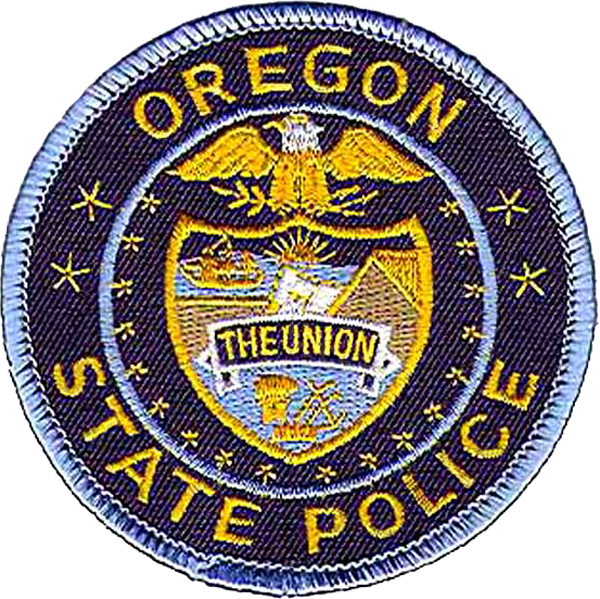
- Patch of Oregon State Police

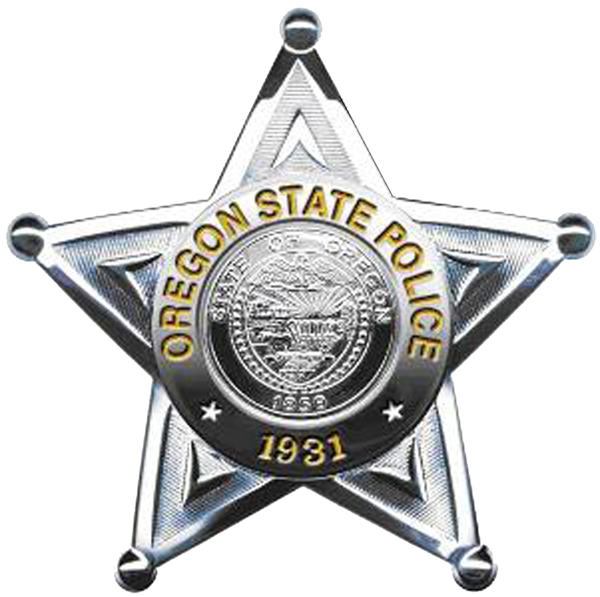
- Badge of Oregon State Police
- Abbreviation: OSP

Agency overview
- Formed: August 1, 1931; 95 years ago
- Preceding agencies: State Highway Commission; Fish and Game Commission; Secretary of State; Prohibition Commissioner

Jurisdictional structure
- Operations jurisdiction: Oregon, USA
- Area: 98,466 square miles (255,030 km^{2})
- Population: 4,272,371 (2024 est.)
- General nature: Civilian police

Operational structure
- Headquarters: 3565 Trelstad Ave SE, Salem, Oregon
- Troopers: 480 (as of 2023)
- Civilian Members: 517 (as of 2014)
- Agency executives: Casey Codding, Superintendent; Josh Brooks, Deputy Superintendent

Website
- www.oregon.gov/OSP

The Oregon State Police (OSP) is a law enforcement agency of the U.S. state of Oregon. The OSP enforces all of Oregon's criminal laws and assists local law enforcement agencies. Casey Codding has served as Superintendent since February 2023. In addition to the Patrol Division, OSP has a Criminal Division (detectives, arson, explosives), SWAT, DPU (Dignitary Protection Unit), MRT (Mobile Response Team), a Forensic Services Division (crime labs), a Fish and Wildlife Division (game wardens), a Medical Examiner's Division, and it is one of the few law enforcement agencies in the United States that monitors the security of the state lottery. Oregon State Police has primary jurisdiction on state highways and all other state owned property. It also frequently responds to incidents in rural areas when local agencies lack capacity or otherwise require assistance.

== History ==
The Oregon State Police began operating on August 1, 1931. The organization was designed by a committee appointed by Governor Julius L. Meier, who made a survey of some of the most successful state law enforcement agencies across North America, including the Royal Canadian Mounted Police, the New Jersey State Police, the Texas Rangers, the Pennsylvania State Police, and others. They took on the responsibilities that were previously handled by the State Highway Commission, the Fish and Game Commission, the Secretary of State, the Prohibition Commissioner, and the State Fire Marshal. OSP's first Superintendent (head) was Charles Pray, State Parole Officer and a former Department of Justice Agent. Mr. Pray set up four OSP districts in the state and thirty-one patrol stations. He began his duties on June 7, 1931, about two months before the State Police began operating.

Harold Maison, formerly with the State Traffic Division, was appointed Chief Clerk and was stationed at General Headquarters in Salem. He was charged with setting up and maintaining a system of reports and records for the OSP.

Captain George Alexander was placed in charge of the Bureau of Identification and Investigation and charged with the investigational activities of the department. On January 1, 1932, he was appointed Deputy Superintendent, a served a position he held until his installment as Warden of the State Penitentiary in 1938.

Charles McClees, previously with the State Game Commission, was appointed captain and placed in charge of game and commercial fish enforcement.

== Titles and Insignia ==
Title	Insignia
Superintendent	
Deputy Superintendent	
Major	
Captain	
Lieutenant	
Sergeant	
Trooper	

== Services ==
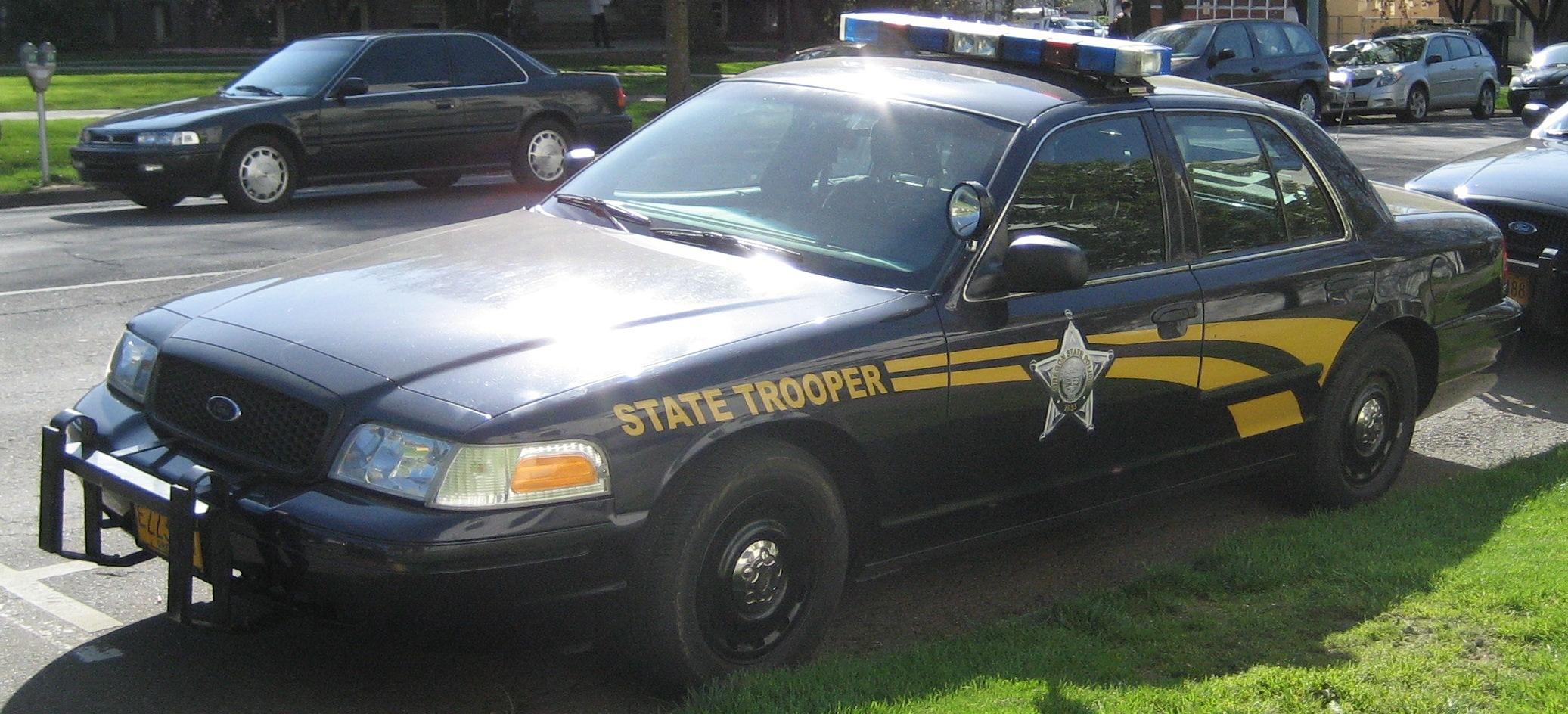
A Ford Crown Victoria Police Interceptor of the Oregon State Police parked at the Oregon State Capitol in April 2007.

=== Criminal Investigation Division ===
- This division's primary duty is to assist other law enforcement agencies throughout the state of Oregon with Criminal Justice Investigations. Within the Criminal Investigation Division there are sub-divisions, those are Major Crimes Section; Drug Enforcement Section; Arson/Explosives Section; and Investigative Reports Section. Members of the Criminal Division participate on teams with more than 40 local, county, and federal agencies.

=== Fish and Wildlife ===
- The Fish and Wildlife division primarily enforces laws and ordinances protecting Oregon wildlife and natural resources, though the Fish and Wildlife troopers also enforce traffic code and all other Oregon criminal laws.

=== Firearms Instant Check System Unit ===
- The Firearms Instant Check System (FICS) Unit is responsible for conducting all background checks for firearm purchases within the state. Oregon is one of 15 states where state law enforcement conduct state-level background checks in addition to the standard FBI background check, Oregon law at ORS 166.412 requires the Oregon State Police to conduct background checks for all firearm transfers, including those that take place at a gun show and between private citizens. In most states, gun dealers with a Federal Firearms License (FFL) use the FBI's National Instant Criminal Background Check System (NICS) to conduct background checks for firearm sales and transfers, however in Oregon the law requires the OSP to maintain an instant check system for conducting criminal background checks for federally licensed gun dealers and private parties prior to the transfer of a firearm. The OSP's FICS Unit maintains an Online Firearms Instant Check System that FFL dealers can access, the system automatically conducts a federal background check through the FBI's NICS, as well as an additional state-level background check of the Oregon Computerized Criminal History (CCH) System, as Oregon law has additional offenses not covered under federal law that can prohibit a person from possessing a firearm, such as conviction of a violent misdemeanor within the previous 4 years.

== Recent changes ==
In 1993, the Oregon Legislature approved legislation that included the previously autonomous organizations of the Oregon State Fire Marshal's Office, Law Enforcement Data System, Oregon Emergency Management, and the Oregon Boxing and Wrestling Commission within the Department of State Police.

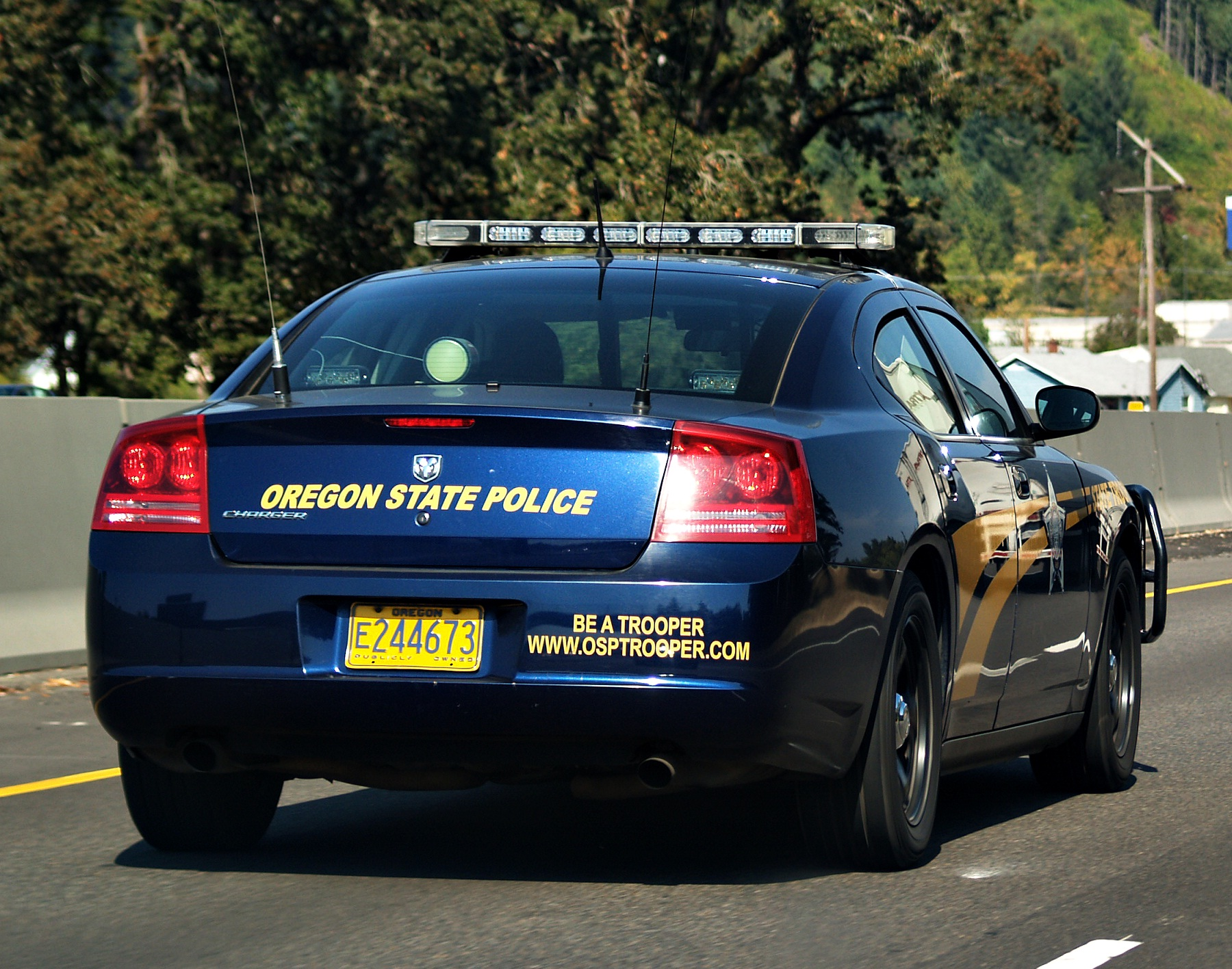
A Dodge Charger of the Oregon State Police in Portland on I-5 in September 2012.

As of late 2018 the agency has been transitioning to the Smith & Wesson M&P 2.0 9MM to replace their current Smith & Wesson M&P .40 S&W sidearms.

== See also ==
- Highway patrol
- List of law enforcement agencies in Oregon
- State patrol
- State police
