= Ashland, Texas =

Unincorporated community in Texas, US

Ashland
- Unincorporated community
- Location in Texas
- Coordinates: 32.6906958°N 94.7043748°W
- Country: United States
- State: Texas
- County: Upshur
- Elevation: 322 ft (98 m)

Ashland is an unincorporated community in Upshur County, Texas, United States. It is situated on Texas State Highway 154. Before the American Civil War, its coast with Cypress Creek was used by freighters to collect cargo. A post office operated from 1894 to 1921, and was originally named Asbury until being renamed to Ashland in 1902. It peaked from the 1890s to the 1910s, with its highest recorded population being 250, c. 1914. Its population gradually declined following World War I, and as of 2000, 45 people resided in the town, up from 20 in 1990.
