= H-Town =

H-Town most commonly refers to the city of Houston, Texas. (see also: Nicknames of Houston#H-Town)

H-Town may also refer to:

- a nickname of Houston, Texas, U.S.
  - Nicknames of Houston
- a nickname of Hamilton, New Zealand
- a nickname of Hari Nagar, West Delhi
- H-Town (band), a R&B music group active from 1990s to present
- "H-Town", a song by Dizzee Rascal from the album The Fifth
- H-Town, a Finnish publisher
