= List of city nicknames in Texas =

This partial list of city nicknames in Texas compiles the aliases, sobriquets and slogans that cities in Texas are known by (or have been known by historically), officially and unofficially, to locals, outsiders or their tourism boards. The Texas state legislature has officially granted many Texas cities honorary designations as the state's "capital" of something. City nicknames can help in establishing a civic identity, helping outsiders recognize a community or attracting people to a community because of its nickname; promote civic pride; and build community unity. Nicknames and slogans that successfully create a new community "ideology or myth" are also believed to have economic value. Their economic value is difficult to measure, but there are anecdotal reports of cities that have achieved substantial economic benefits by "branding" themselves by adopting new slogans.

Some of the nicknames are positive, while others are derisive. The unofficial nicknames listed here are those that have been used for such a long time or have gained so wide a currency that they have become well known in their own right.

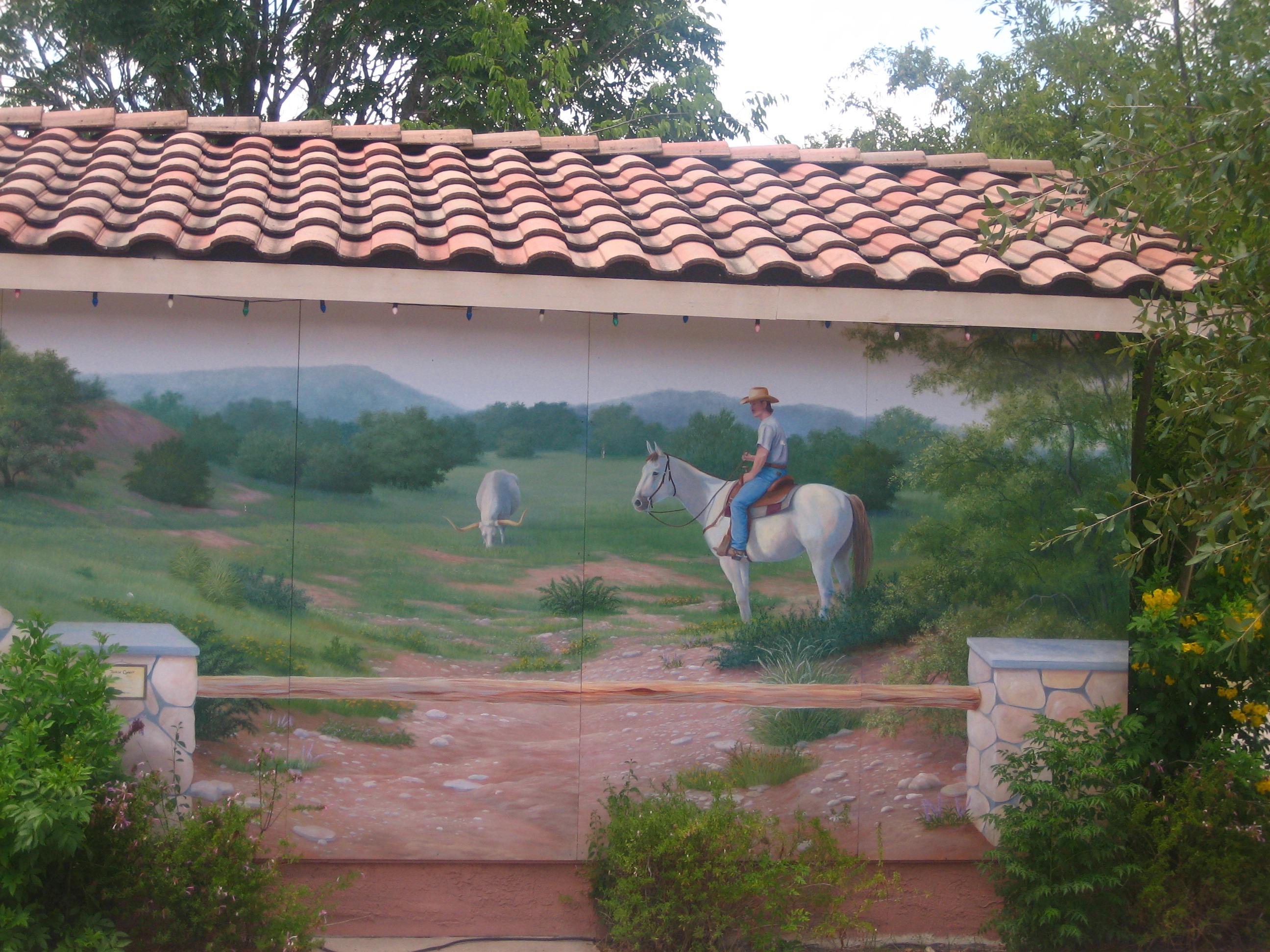
This mural painting of a cowboy is in Bandera, which is nicknamed "Cowboy Capital of the World".

== Nicknames by city ==
=== A-C ===
- Abilene
  - The Key City
  - Lene Town (used in hip-hop culture)
- Alpine – Gateway to the Big Bend
- Amarillo- The Big Brown Flat, Bomb City (due to proximity to the Pantex facility), Yellow City
- Anahuac – Alligator Capital of Texas
- Anthony – Leap Year Capital of the World (shared with Anthony, New Mexico)
- Arlington – The American Dream City
- Athens – Blackeyed Pea Capital of the World
- Austin
  - ATX
  - Bat City
  - The Capitol City
  - The City of Legends
  - City of the Violet Crown
  - Hippie Haven
  - "Blueberry in the Red State"
  - Live Music Capital of the World
  - River City
  - Silicon Hills
  - The Velvet Rut
- Baird – Antique Capital of Texas
- Bandera – Cowboy Capital of the World
- Bells
  - Crossroads of Friendliness
- Bertram – Home of the Oatmeal Festival
- Boerne – Key to the Hill Country
- Brady – The True Heart of Texas
- Brackettville – Home of John Wayne's The Alamo
- Breckenridge – Mural Capital of Texas
- Brenham – Ice Cream City
- Brownsville – Chess Capital of Texas
- Buda – Outdoor Capital of Texas
- Burnet
  - Bluebonnet co-Capital of Texas (with Llano, TX)
  - It is pronounced BURN-IT, Durn-it, Can't ya LEARN it?
- Caldwell – Kolache Capital of Texas
- Clifton – Norwegian Capital of Texas
- College Station – Aggieland, Cstat
- Colorado City – The Heart of West Texas
- Commerce – Bois d'arc Capital of Texas
- Corpus Christi – Sparkling City by the Sea
- Corsicana – Fruit Cake Capital of the World, Cana
- Crystal City – Spinach Capital of the World
- Cuero – Turkey Capital of the World

=== D-F ===
- Dallas
  - Big D
  - City of Hate
  - D-Town
  - Metroplex (with Fort Worth)
  - Pegasus City
  - Triple D
  - DTX
- Danevang – Danish Capital of Texas
- Deer Park – The Birthplace of Texas
- Denison – Wine Root Stock Capital of the World
- Denton
  - Little Austin
  - Little D
  - Redbud Capital of Texas
- Dickens – Wild Boar Capital
- Dublin – Irish Capital of Texas
- Duncanville – City of Champions
- Eagle Lake – Goose Hunting Capital of the World
- Eagle Pass – Where Yee-Ha Meets Olé
- El Paso
  - The City With a Legend
  - Chuco Town
  - El Chuco
  - EPT
  - The Sun City
- Electra – Pump Jack Capital of Texas
- Elgin – Sausage Capital of Texas
- Ennis – Bluebonnet City
- Falfurrias - Land of Heart's Delight
- Floresville – Peanut Capital of Texas
- Flower Mound – FloMo
- Floydada – Pumpkin Capital
- Fort Davis – Where the Stars Come Out to Play
- Fort Worth
  - Cowtown
  - Funky Town
  - Panther City
  - Metroplex (with Dallas)
  - Queen City of the Prairie
  - Fort Crunk
  - Where the West Begins
  - The Big Juicy
  - The Fort
- Fredericksburg
  - Fritztown
  - Polka Capital of Texas
- Friona – Cheeseburger Capital of Texas
- Frisco - Sports City, USA

=== G-L ===
- Gainesville – The Front Porch of Texas
- Galveston
  - Oleander City
  - G-town
  - Galveston Island
  - Galvatraz
- Gatesville – Spur Capital of Texas
- George West – Storyfest Capital of Texas
- Georgetown – Red Poppy Capital of Texas
- Gilmer – Home of the Yamboree (refers to yams)
- Glen Rose – Dinosaur Capital of Texas
- Gonzales – Lexington of Texas. (The first battle of the Texas Revolution occurred here; the name is a reference to Lexington, Massachusetts, where the American Revolutionary War began.)
- Grapevine – Christmas Capital of Texas
- Hamilton – Dove Capital of Texas
- Happy – The Town Without a Frown
- Hawkins – Pancake Capital of Texas
- Hearne – Sunflower Capital of Texas
- Hebbronville - Vaquero Capital of Texas
- Hereford – Town Without a Toothache
- Houston -- see Nicknames of Houston
- Huntsville
  - Prison City of Texas (the Texas Department of Criminal Justice is headquartered in Huntsville)
  - Execution Capital of the World/Death Penalty City (Texas' execution chamber is located in Huntsville, and Texas often leads all US states in executions per year; death row was located in Huntsville but later relocated)
  - Huntsvegas
  - Bluntsville
- Hutto – Hippo Capital of Texas
- Jacksonville – Tomato Capital of the World
- Jasper – Butterfly Capital of Texas
- Jefferson – Bed and Breakfast Capital of Texas
- Jones Creek – Historic City of the Future
- Kaufman – Red Tail Hawk Capital
- Kenedy
  - Horned Lizard Capital of Texas
  - Texas Horned Lizard Capital of the World
- Kerrville – Lose Your Heart to the Hills, Heavens Waiting Room
- Kilgore – Texas City of Stars
- Killeen – Kill City
- Kingsville – Gem City of the Southwest
- Knox City – Seedless Watermelon Capital of Texas
- Lake Jackson – The City of Enchantment
- Laredo
  - The City Under Seven Flags
  - The Gateway City
- Linden – Music City Texas
- Llano – Deer Capital of Texas
- Lockhart – Barbecue Capital of Texas
- Longview – Purple Martin Capital of Texas
- Lubbock
  - Hub City
  - Hub of the Plains
- Lufkin – Crossroads of East Texas

=== M-Q ===
- Madisonville – Mushroom Capital of Texas
- Mansfield - Murdafield
- Marlin – Hot Mineral Water City of Texas
- Mauriceville – Crawfish Capital of Texas
- McAllen
  - City of Palms
  - Square Dance Capital of the World
  - The Texas Tropics
- McCamey – Wind Energy Capital of Texas
- Mercedes - The Queen City
- Mesquite – Rodeo Capital of Texas
- Midland
  - Ostrich Capital of Texas
  - The Tall City
  - Petroplex (shared with Odessa)
- Midlothian – Cement and Steel Capital of Texas
- Mineola – Birding capital of East Texas
- Mission – Home of the Ruby Red Grapefruit
- Mineral Wells - Miserable Wells
- Mount Pleasant – Bass Capital of Texas
- Nacogdoches – The Oldest Town in Texas
- Naples – The Watermelon Capital of The World
- Navasota – Blues Capital of Texas
- New Fairview - Keeping It Country
- Odessa
  - Jackrabbit Capital of Texas or Jackrabbit-Roping Capital of Texas
  - Petroplex (shared with Midland)
- Palacios
  - City By The Sea
  - Shrimp Capital of Texas
- Paris – Crape Myrtle City
- Plano – Hot Air Balloon Capital of Texas
- Port Arthur – Energy City
- Quitman – Big Bass Capital of Texas

=== R-T ===
- Roanoke – The Unique Dining Capital of Texas
- Rockwall - Live Music Capital of North Texas
- Round Rock – Daffodil Capital of Texas
- San Angelo
  - The End of the Rainbow
  - The Oasis of West Texas (The city is unusual in West Texas for having three rivers and three lakes.)
  - Queen City of Central West Texas
  - Texas' biggest small town
  - Wool Capital or the Wool and Mohair Capital of the World
- San Antonio
  - 210
  - Alamo City
  - Countdown City
  - Spurs Nation
  - Deuce Dime
  - River City
  - San Antone
  - Something to Remember
  - Military City, USA
- San Marcos
  - San Marvelous
- Sanderson – Cactus Capital of Texas
- Sansom Park – City on the Move
- Seguin – Pecan Capital of the World
- Shenandoah – More Than Just a Song
- Smiley – Poultry Capital of the World
- Smithville – Heart of the Megalopolis
- Temple – Wildflower Capital of Texas
- Terlingua – Chili Capital of the World
- Texarkana
  - Twice as Nice
  - T-Town
  - Twin City
  - TK
- Texas City – City by the Bay
- The Colony – City by the Lake
- The Woodlands
  - The Hoodlands
  - The Bubble
  - Disney Woods
- Turkey – Western Swing Capital of the World
- Tyler – Rose Capital of the World

=== U-Z ===
- Victoria – The Crossroads of South Texas
- Waco – The Buckle of the Bible Belt
- Waxahachie – Crape Myrtle Capital of Texas, Hachie
- Weatherford
  - Cutting horse capital of the world.
  - Peach Capital of Texas
  - Watermelon Capital of the World.
- Weslaco – Citrus Capital of Texas
- West – Czech Heritage Capital of Texas
- West Tawakoni – Catfish Capital of Texas
- Wichita Falls – The City That Faith Built, The Falls, Falls Town, Fallsvegas
- Wills Point – Bluebird Capital of Texas

== See also ==
- List of city nicknames in the United States
- List of municipalities in Texas
