= Nicknames of Houston =

Bynames of the city in Texas, US

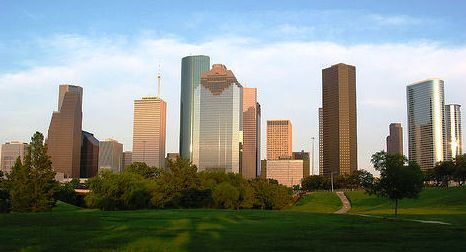
The skyline of the city of Houston

There are many nicknames for the city of Houston, the largest city in Texas and fourth-largest city in the United States. The city's nicknames reflect its geography, economy, multicultural population, and popular culture, including sports and music. They are often used by the media and in popular culture to reference the city.

Houston currently has one official nickname, "Space City", signifying the city's global importance to space exploration and historical role as a prominent center of activity by the National Aeronautics and Space Administration (NASA). Cities adopt official nicknames such as this one to establish a civic identity, promote civic pride, and build community unity. Houston has had other nicknames in the past which have faded in common usage, going as far back as the 1870s.

The city has recently accumulated several unofficial nicknames from among sub-groups within the city, including several whose origins are in the local hip-hop subculture. The most recently added nickname is "The Big Heart", which refers to assistance given by Houston and its citizens to the victims of Hurricane Katrina in 2005 and 2006.

== Official nickname ==
=== Space City ===
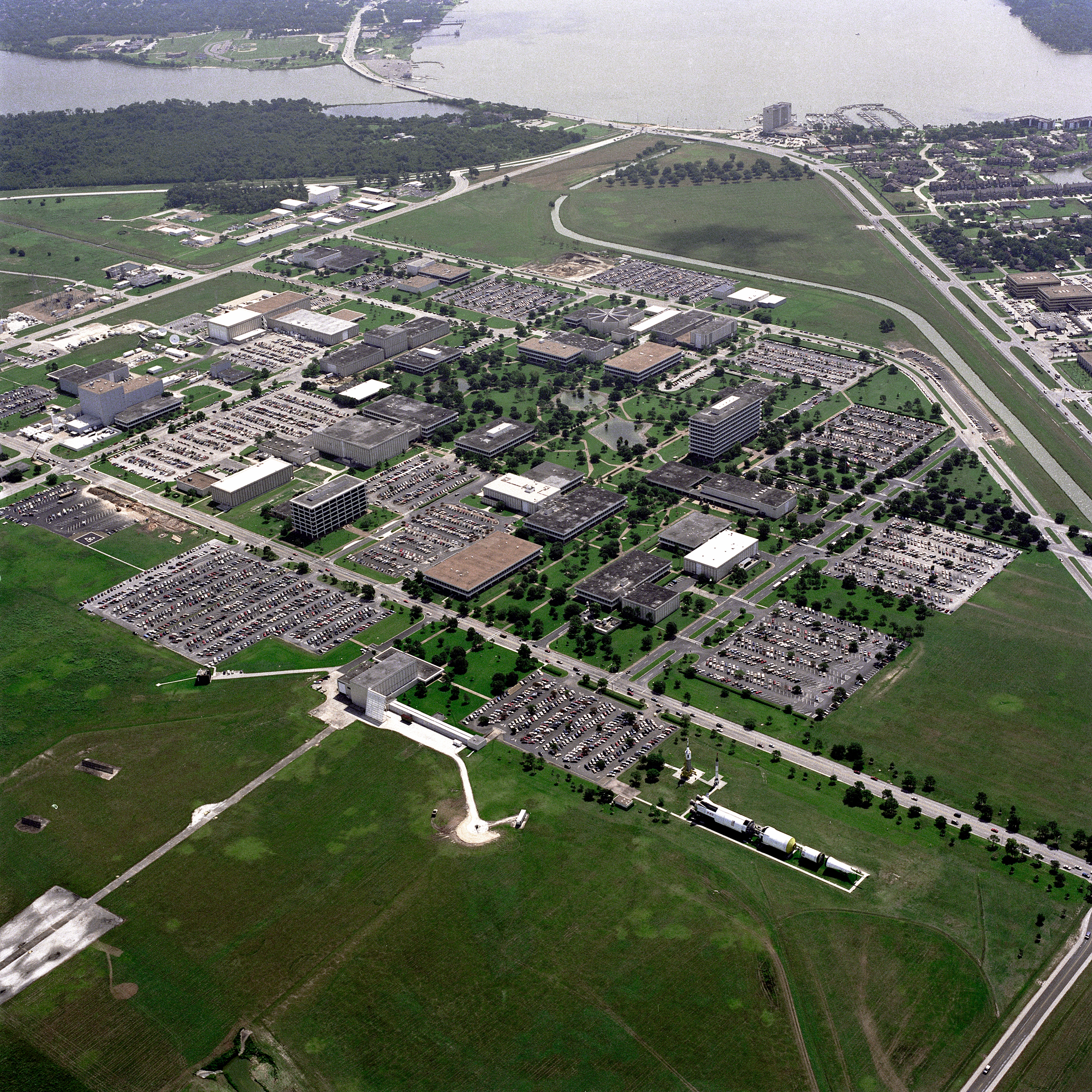
Johnson Space Center

Houston received its official nickname of "Space City" in 1967 because it is home to NASA's Manned Spacecraft Center.

NASA's center in Houston has its origins in the Space Task Group which directed its first crewed spaceflight program, Project Mercury. In 1961, it grew into a bigger organization as the Manned Spacecraft Center, and in 1962 moved into a newly built campus on land donated by Rice University. It was renamed the Lyndon B. Johnson Space Center (JSC) in honor of Texas U.S. Senator, Vice President, and President Lyndon B. Johnson in 1973, the year Johnson died. As Senate Majority Leader, Johnson played a decisive role in passage of the legislation which created NASA in 1958. JSC contains the Christopher C. Kraft Jr. Mission Control Center, which coordinates and monitors all human spaceflight for the United States, and directed all Space Shuttle missions and activities aboard the International Space Station. The visitor center of JSC is Space Center Houston.

Some of the first words transmitted by Neil Armstrong from the Moon, "Houston, Tranquility Base here. The Eagle has landed", are written in 15 languages on bronze plaques placed along the main entrance of Tranquility Park in downtown Houston. A replica of one of the footprints left on the Moon by Neil Armstrong is also on display inside the park.

== Popular nicknames ==
=== HOU ===
The 3-letter abbreviation for the city, taken from the IATA airport code for William P. Hobby Airport.

=== Bayou City ===
Houston is popularly known as "The Bayou City" (and less frequently as "Baghdad on the Bayou") because it is home to ten winding waterways that flow through the surrounding area. Buffalo Bayou is the main waterway flowing through the city and has a significant place in Texas history, not only due to the founding place of the City of Houston, but also because the final battle for Texas Independence was fought along its banks. Other major bayous in the city include White Oak Bayou, Brays Bayou and Sims Bayou.

=== H-Town ===
"H-Town" is a widely popular modern nickname for Houston. It is commonly used in reference to the city both locally and internationally, especially within the entertainment community. In addition, the H-Town Blues Festival is a music festival held each year in the city, and the H-Town Arena Theatre has hosted a variety of performing artists from around the country since the 1970s. H-Town (with the "H" standing for Houston) is also the name of an R&B and hip hop band from Houston that was formed in 1992. H-Town is the term most often used in the music of the Screwed Up Click hip-hop community of the South Side of Houston, alongside the nickname "city of syrup" in reference to lean, a Houston area creation.

=== Hustle Town ===
"Hustle Town", another popular local nickname for Houston, is often used to reference the city's significance as an international center of commerce, trade, and more recently, music, art, and a rapidly growing population center that 'never seems to rest'. Houston is sometimes compared to larger, older cities and pop-cultural centers, sometimes being referred to as the "New York' or 'L.A' of the South", and is the fourth largest city in the United States, in terms of population size. The term 'Hustle Town' was popularized by Houston rapper SPM, following the release of Hustle Town in 1998, which was followed with a rise in the usage of the term in hip-hop music and culture in the Houston scene. The term is also often used by sports teams, corporations, slogans, or groups in Houston, such as the Houston Astros, with the phrase "Welcome to Hustle Town", which can be seen painted on the south side of Daikin Park.

=== Sport nicknames ===
==== Clutch City ====
The nickname of "Clutch City" was given to the city of Houston after the Houston Rockets won the 1994 and 1995 NBA championships. The moniker was adopted in response to a front-page headline in the Houston Chronicle declaring Houston to be "Choke City". It was revived in 2005, as the Houston Astros had a late-season rally to win the pennant and clinch their first-ever World Series appearance, and again in 2006, when the Houston Dynamo won the MLS Cup in their inaugural season.

The Rockets' mascot, "Clutch the Bear", was named the 5th-most recognizable mascot in sports by USA Today in February 2005, and was inducted into the Mascot Hall of Fame in 2006.

==== Crush City ====
Crush City is a nickname that derived from the 2015 Houston Astros season. "Crush" is a reference to the high number of home runs delivered by the Houston Astros, as the team ended with the second most home runs in MLB.

== Historic nicknames ==
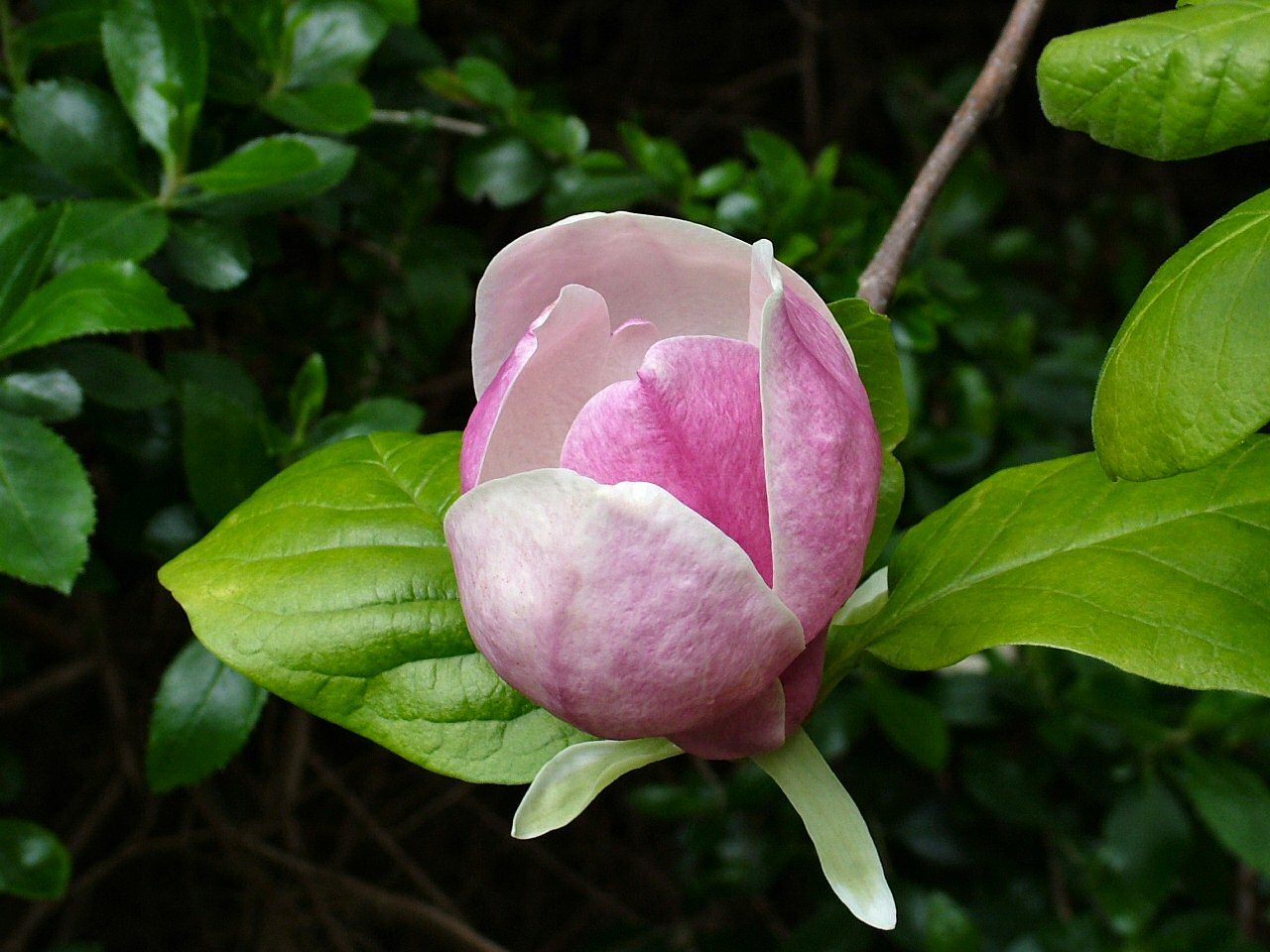
A Magnolia flower in bloom

=== Magnolia City ===
"Magnolia City" is one of the earliest of Houston's many nicknames. The Texas World, a newspaper first published in 1900, is said to have labeled Houston "the Magnolia City", but the nickname had been in use among the locals since the 1870s. Areas of east Houston, particularly Harrisburg and Magnolia Park, were once natural Magnolia forests that were wiped out by urban sprawl by the 1920s. The nickname is still sometimes used in media stories about the city.

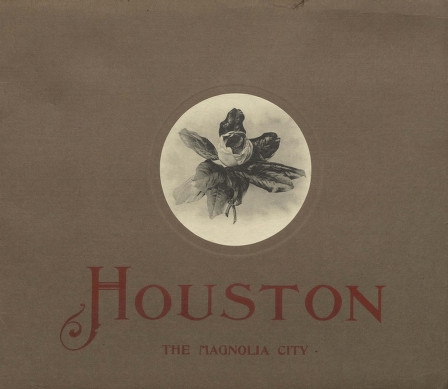
1912 pamphlet with illustrations of Houston

=== Capital of the Sunbelt ===
The nickname "Capital of the Sunbelt" (also "Golden Buckle on the Sun Belt") appeared during the boomtown years when the city experienced rapid growth. In the late 1970s, Houston was experiencing a population increase, as people from Rust Belt states moved en masse into Texas. The new residents mostly came for the numerous employment opportunities in the petroleum industry, resulting from the Arab Oil Embargo.

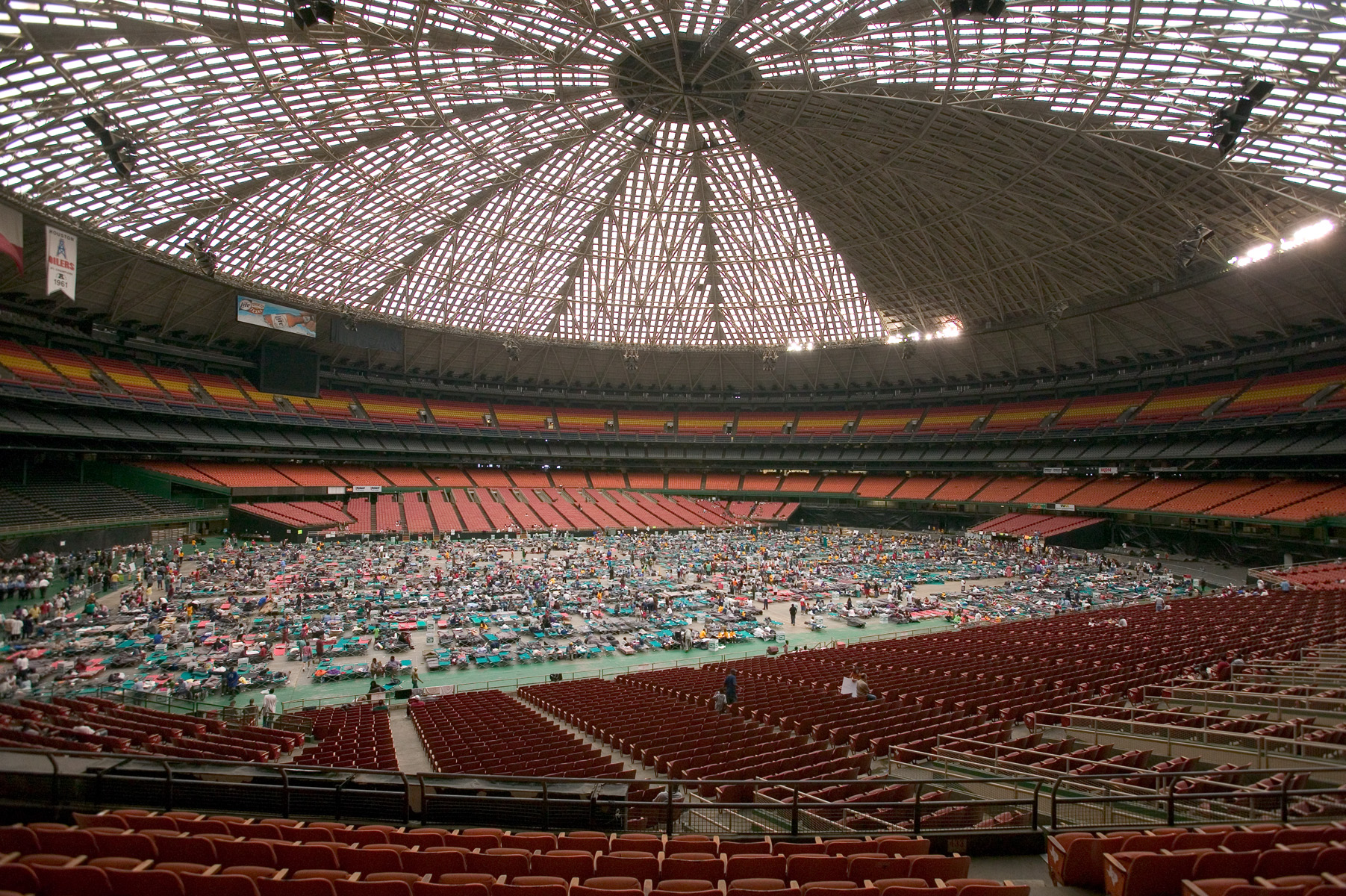
Katrina evacuees shelter at the Reliant Astrodome.

=== The Big Heart ===
The "Big Heart" is a nickname Houston earned in 2005–06 among many of the storm victims from Louisiana and other affected areas who sought refuge there in the aftermath of Hurricane Katrina. Angelo Edwards, vice chair of the ACORN Katrina Survivors Association, said, "No other city really provided the resources and assistance Houston has."

Houston housed, fed and mended more than 150,000 survivors in an effort that won acclaim throughout the United States, mounting what is believed to be the biggest shelter operation in the country's history, including Mobile Army Surgical Hospital (MASH)-like mega-clinics that took on problems ranging from emergency care to eyeglass prescriptions.

"This has been a real success story", said Houston Mayor Bill White. "So many Houstonians stepped up to help our neighbors from Louisiana. It was humbling, and it showed the world the big heart and the incredible talent of our city."

== Subculture and groups ==
=== City of Lean ===
The "City of Lean" nickname (also "Lean City") refers to the enjoyment of codeine-laced cough syrup, sometimes called purple drank, that has been popular in Houston and is associated with some rap artists. Houston rap artist Big Moe used this nickname for the title of his 2000 album City of Syrup, whose cover featured an image of purple ooze being poured over the Houston skyline.

=== Houstone ===
"Houstone" is generally used to refer to members of the Texas prison gang "Tango Blast". However, "Houstone" is also used amongst them to claim Houston as their city as a form of identification.

=== Mutt City ===
Coined by food writer John T. Edge in Oxford American: "... a name that combines the city's embrace of the variety and splendor of the foods from our immigrant communities and our penchant for crossing the lines and boundaries between not only different cuisines but between high-dollar and low-brow fare."

=== Ozone City ===
"Ozone City" is a relatively new term used among the Punk, Alternative, and artistic communities. Its precise origins are not known, but possibly in relation to the high levels of Ozone in the city.

=== Screwston ===
"Screwston" is a popular modern nickname for the city of Houston. It is widely known by fans of local hip-hop artist DJ Screw and his style of music, known as "chopped and screwed".

== Marketing slogan ==
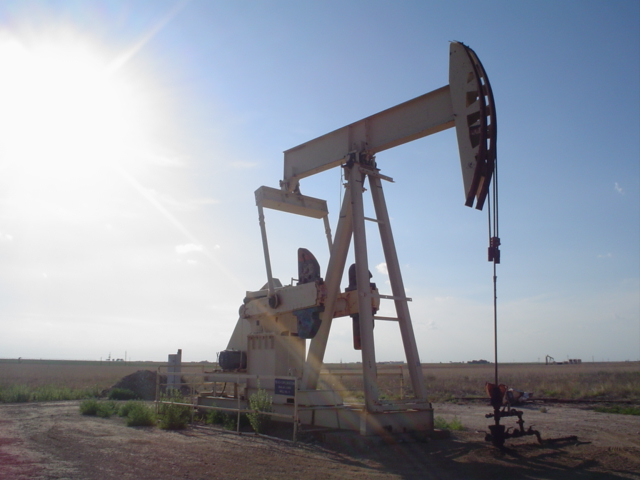
An oil well in Texas

=== The Energy Capital of the World ===
Houston is considered by many to be "The Energy Capital of the World," because the city is home to more than 5,000 energy-related firms. The city is a leading domestic and international center for virtually every segment of the oil and gas industry—exploration, production, transmission, marketing, service, supply, offshore drilling, and technology.

Houston dominates U.S. oil and gas exploration and production and is unrivaled in the American energy industry. It is home to more than 3,600 energy-related establishments. Houston is also home to 13 of the nation's 20 largest natural gas transmission companies, 600 exploration and production firms and more than 170 pipeline operators. Houston also hosts the annual Offshore Technology Conference which is the world's largest energy-related trade show.

== See also ==
- List of city nicknames in Texas
- Culture of Houston
