= Carver Christian High School =

Location
- 7650 Sapperton Avenue; Burnaby, British Columbia, V3N 4E1; Canada; 49.2364°N 122.8991°W

Information
- School type: Secondary school, Private School, Independent, Co-educational, Christian
- Opened: September 2005 – June 2018
- Status: Closed; separated into Vancouver Christian and John Knox Christian secondary schools
- Grades: 8-12, 7-12 (2016–2018)
- Language: English
- Colours: French, dark grey, light grey
- Team name: Phoenix
- Website: www.carverchristian.org

Carver Christian High School (abbreviated to CCHS) was a Christian independent secondary school in Burnaby, British Columbia.

== Overview ==
Carver Christian was established under the partnership of elementary and middle schools Vancouver Christian School and John Knox Christian School. It is sanctioned by the B.C. Ministry of Education and incorporates a Christian perspective in its curriculum.

== History ==
Carver served a high school population from grade 8 through grade 12. In 2017, Carver included a class of 7th graders graduating primarily from Vancouver Christian School during their building reconstruction. Carver shared a close connection with VCS and Johns Knox until its closure in 2018.

== Notable Clubs ==
The Carver Cancer Awareness Club was founded in 2016 to promote the works of the Canadian Cancer Society and provide volunteer opportunities for student service. The Club's work was well recognized and acknowledged regularly by the school's news letters. The Cancer Awareness Club was also responsible for organizing the annual Terry Fox Run, which raised money in support of Cancer Research.

The Carver Ski Club existed from 2016-2017 and organized expeditions to the Cypress Ski Resort for students

== Ranking ==
Carver Christian was ranked 30th out of 253 secondary schools in British Columbia according to the Fraser Institute's 2016-17 rankings, reported in 2018.
