= CCH =

CCH may refer to:

== Companies ==
- CCH (company), a tax software company
  - CCH Canadian, CCH's Canadian subsidiary
- Coca-Cola HBC AG, Coca-Cola Hellenic

== Education ==
- Cadet College Hasan Abdal, a boarding school in Pakistan
- Centre for Computing in the Humanities, an academic department and research centre at King's College London
- Colegio de Ciencias y Humanidades, the undergraduate school system of the National Autonomous University of Mexico
- Columbia College Hollywood, a film school in California
- Covington Catholic High School, a private high school in Park Hills, Kentucky

== Medicine ==
- Central Clinical Hospital, a Russian hospital
- Central Council of Homoeopathy, an Indian professional council of homeopathy
- Certified Clinical Hypnotherapist, a practitioner of hypnotherapy
- John H. Stroger Jr. Hospital of Cook County, formerly known as Cook County Hospital
- Cheshire Home, Chung Hom Kok, a hospital in Chung Hom Kok, Hong Kong

== People ==
- C. C. H. Pounder (born 1950), American actress

== Physics ==
- Cosmic censorship hypothesis, a conjecture about the structure of gravitational singularities ("black holes")

== Other uses ==
- CCH Canadian Ltd v Law Society of Upper Canada, a leading Supreme Court of Canada case on originality in copyrights
- Chief of Chaplains of the United States Army, the chief supervising officer of the U.S. Army Chaplain Corps
- Chichester railway station, England, station code CCH
- Community Campaign (Hart), a political party in the Hart District, England
- Computerized Criminal History, a system used by the FBI and a number of US states
- Concealed carry, of a handgun
- Congress Center Hamburg, a convention center
