= Chung Cheng High School =

Chung Cheng High School may refer to the following secondary schools in Singapore:

- Chung Cheng High School (Main), in Marine Parade
- Chung Cheng High School (Yishun), in Yishun
