= Long Point–Eureka Heights fault system =

Geological fault in Texas, US

The Long Point–Eureka Heights fault system is a system of geologic faults in Houston, Texas. It runs beneath the metropolitan area from the southwest to the northeast. The various faults are characterized as normal faults, meaning that the downthrown side is in the direction of the dip of the fault plane. This fault system as well as others located in nearby parts of Texas are believed to have formed millions of years ago during the formation of the Gulf of Mexico. No significant earthquakes have occurred on these faults in historic times, but slow movement has been observed.

== Gallery ==
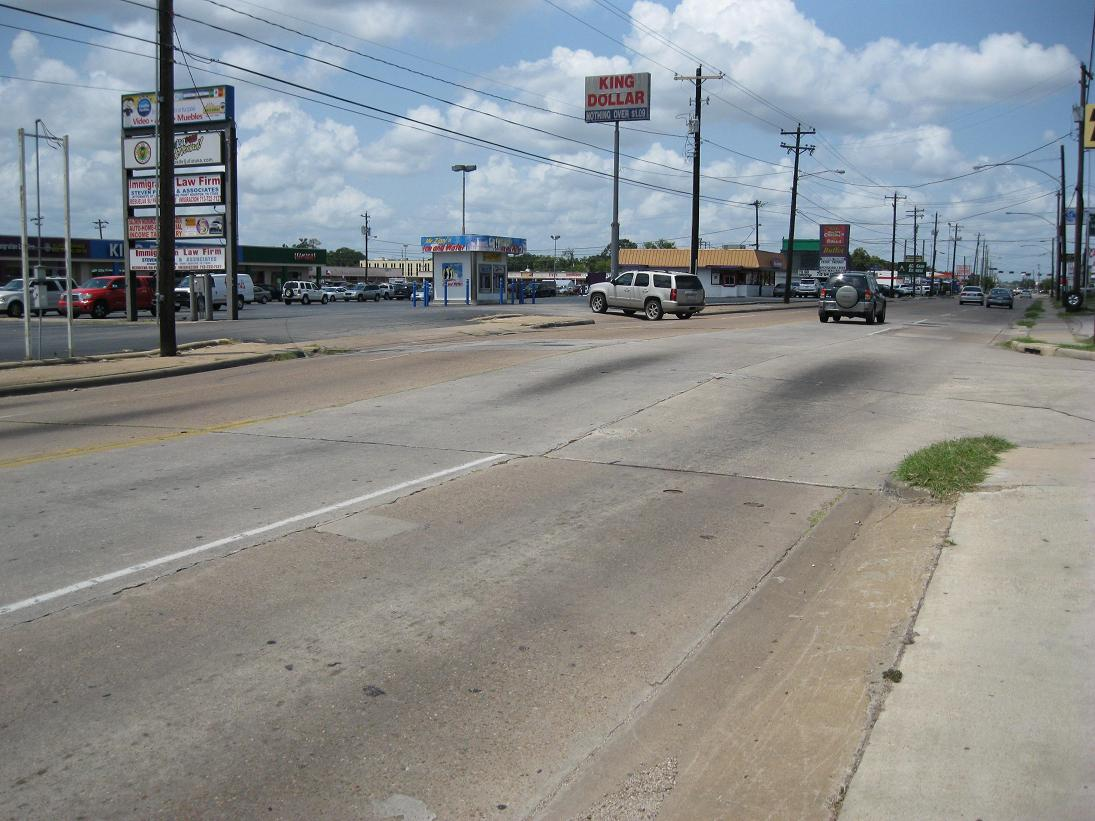
View is SW at Long Point Road and Lynnview. Upthrown side of the Long Point Fault is to the right. Fault passes to the left of the kiosk.

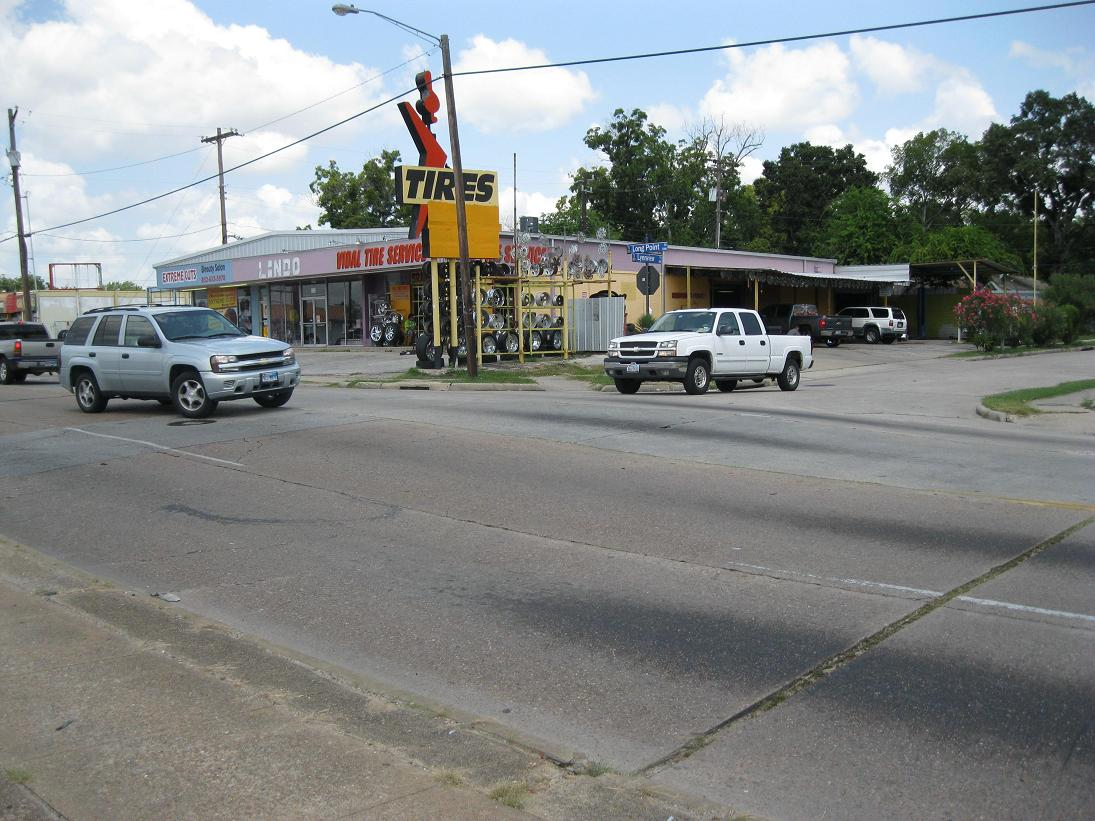
View is NW at Long Point Road and Lynnview. Long Point Fault passes left-right across the photo center.

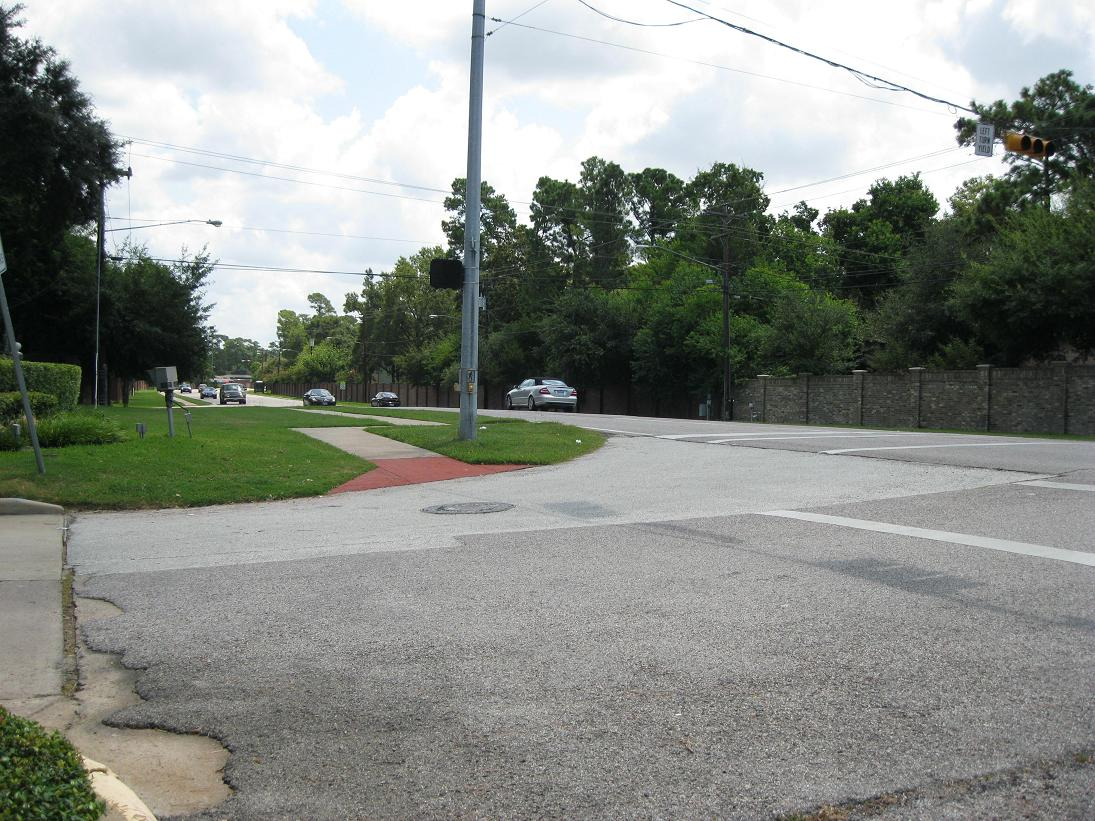
View is east on Memorial Drive at W. Forest. Approaching cars are on the downthrown side of the Long Point Fault.
