= Pierce Junction, Houston =

Area within Houston, Texas

Pierce Junction is an area within Houston, Texas, United States that was formerly a distinct unincorporated community in Harris County. By the late 1960s Houston had annexed all of Pierce Junction.

The community, which served as the junction of several railroad lines, gained its name in 1859 from Thomas Peirce (note the unusual spelling of his surname), an attorney and financier from Boston who also owned land in the vicinity.
