= Catholic Central High School =

Catholic Central High School may refer to:

- Burlington Catholic Central High School, Burlington, Wisconsin
- Catholic Central High School (Grand Rapids, Michigan)
- Catholic Central High School (Lethbridge, Alberta)
- Catholic Central High School (London, Ontario)
- Catholic Central High School (Marinette, Wisconsin)
- Detroit Catholic Central High School, Novi, Michigan
- Catholic Central School (Springfield, Ohio)
- Steubenville Catholic Central High School, Ohio
- Catholic Central High School (Troy, New York)
- Catholic Central High School (Windsor, Ontario)
- Catholic Central High School (Hammond, Indiana), now known as Bishop Noll Institute
- Catholic Central High School (Manistee, Michigan)

== See also ==
- Central Catholic High School (disambiguation)
