= Cypress Creek EMS =

Cypress Creek Emergency Medical Services
- Motto: When seconds count...Count on us
- Established: 1975
- Headquarters: Houston, Texas
- Total area (sq. miles): 166 square miles
- BLS or ALS: ALS
- Ambulances: Type-I Mobile Intensive Care Units
- CEO: Wren Nealy
- Medical director: Levon Vartanian
- Responses: 60,000

Cypress Creek Emergency Medical Services Association, also known as Cypress Creek EMS (CCEMS) was a private, non-profit emergency medical service provider for Harris County ESD 11 in North Harris County, within greater Houston, Texas. In 2021, CCEMS declared bankruptcy and operations ceased in mid 2022. In late 2022, the remaining assets, branding, and trademarks were bought by Viking Enterprises, DBA City Ambulance Service. All ambulances in use by CCEMS are Mobile Intensive Care Units (MICU), with at least one Paramedic, making all ambulances ALS units. Cypress Creek EMS provided 911 service in North Harris County, provided bicycle medic teams for special events, provided tactical EMS support for federal, state, and local law enforcement, and operated an accredited educational institution.

== History ==
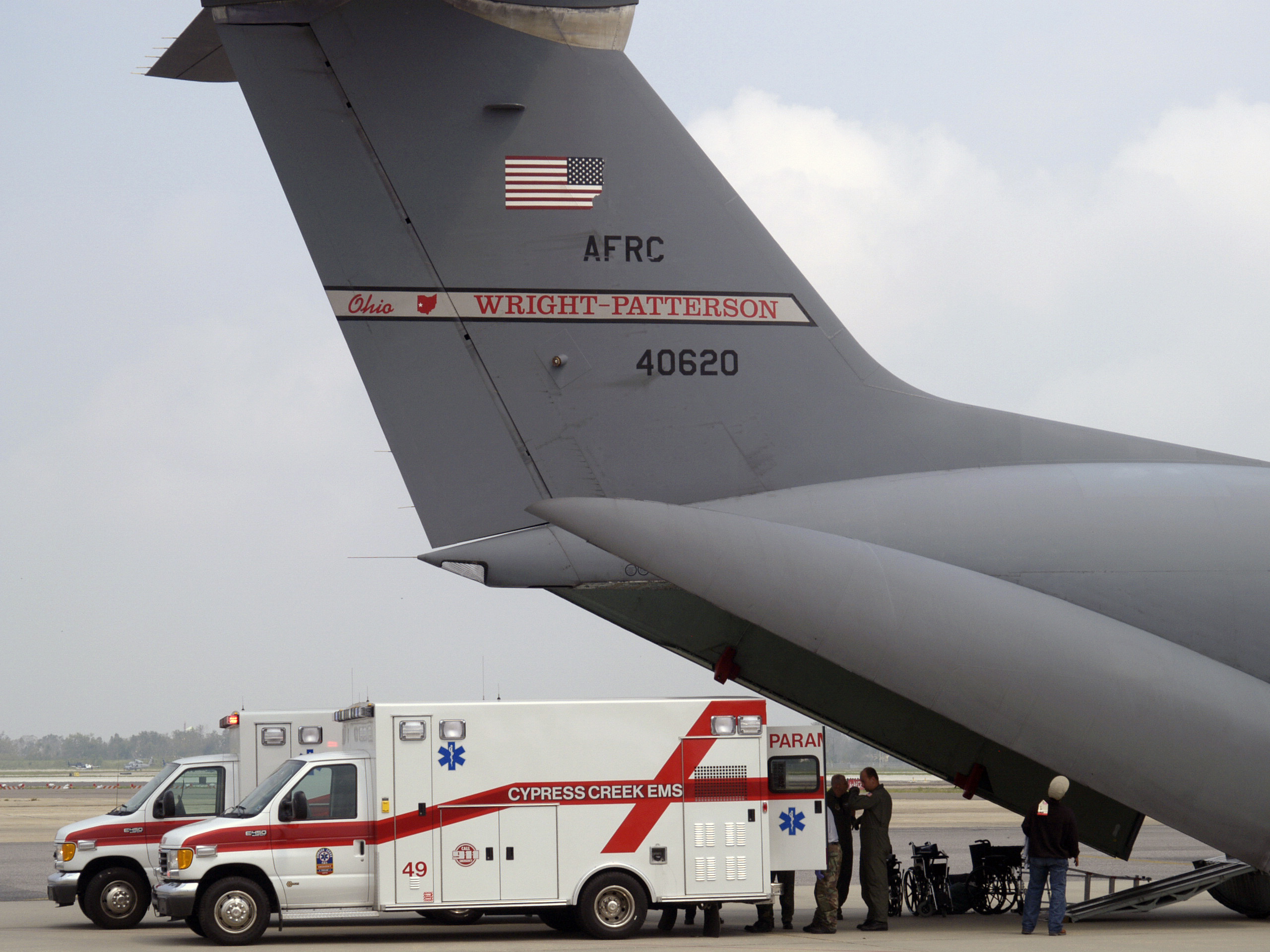
Two ambulances at New Orleans airport during Hurricane Katrina aftermath

In November 1974, a tragic event occurred in which a man died from a heart attack without pre-hospital care. Afterward, The FM 1960 Community (The stretch of FM 1960 between I-45 and SH 249), took the initiative to form an emergency medical service which came to be known as Cypress Creek EMS, named after the large creek that runs through the area. CCEMS was chartered as a non-profit corporation by the state of Texas on July 25, 1975. https://ccemsnews.com/2016/07/20/cypress-creek-turns-41/

The community desperately raised funds to establish the service and they soon purchased the first ambulance, which arrived on December 14, 1975. At this time, all of the CCEMS staff were volunteers with no reimbursement for their services. To this day, volunteers are a large and integral part of the staff and they range from non-medical drivers to emergency medical technicians to paramedics.

The service relied heavily on donations and fundraisers as it did not receive government funding. Third-Party billing was initiated in 1993 and allowed Cypress Creek EMS to bill insured patients to help with reimbursement. CCEMS was previously affiliated with Emergency Services District 11 and about 51% of its funding was derived from tax dollars.

By 2020, CCEMS was responding to 45,000 – 50,000 calls a year and operated a fleet of twenty-two MICU Type I ambulances with two supervisors in SUVs. CCEMS also provided medical oversight for first responder fire departments and had a volunteer community first responder program allowing qualified EMS personnel to respond to emergency calls in their personal vehicles before a medic unit arrived. CCEMS also operated a bicycle medic team that provided first response at large events such as parades, festivals, races, and Ironman events. The bicycle medic team deployed with an urbane terrain vehicle (UTV) capable of carrying a patient on a stretcher along with trained EMTs and paramedics on bicycles with BLS and ALS treatment equipment. CCEMS also operated a tactical medic team consisting of specially trained paramedics who were also commissioned peace officers and provided medical support for law enforcement tactical teams, including Texas DPS, the FBI, and several local and county law enforcement agencies.

== Litigation and Bankruptcy ==
In February 2019, news broke of publicly funded employees repairing non-fleet vehicles using facilities and equipment intended to service ambulances. Following this, Harris County ESD 11 commissioned several audits and investigations into CCEMS. The CEO, Bradley England, was forced into retirement at this point and replaced by COO Wren Nealy, Jr. In September, 2020, Cypress Creek EMS was served with a 360 day notice that their contract was being cancelled by Harris County ESD 11 and subsequently was sued by ESD 11. In September 2021, Cypress Creek EMS ceased providing 911 responses and transitioned to providing interfacility transports including critical care transports for CHI St Luke’s Health System and for other facilities in the greater Houston area. Critical care capabilities included non-invasive high-flow oxygen therapy, advanced mechanical ventilation, IABP and ECMO transports, ultrasound, and invasive pressure monitoring. Cypress Creek EMS also became licensed as an aeromedical EMS provider and conducted fixed-wing transports.

In November 2021, Cypress Creek EMS declared Chapter 11 bankruptcy and laid off more than 50% of staff, and on May 31, 2022, Cypress Creek EMS ceased all medical operations and entered into liquidation as part of a settlement agreement with Harris County ESD 11. In late 2022, remaining assets, trademarks, and branding were bought by Viking Enterprises (DBA City Ambulance Service).

== Notable Achievements ==
In 2017, CCEMS along with its partner ESD 48 Fire Department in the Katy area became the first ground EMS system in the US to carry blood products and low-titer Type O whole blood in the field.

In 2018, CCEMS became the first EMS system to deploy body-worn cameras on all paramedics.

CCEMS medics were instantly recognizable due to their bright red uniform shirts—a rare uniform color for EMS in the United States. In order to keep an image of professionalism, members wore the uniforms year-round as opposed to other services which may permit their members to wear shorts or polo shirts during the summertime.

In 2015, CCEMS Chief Operating Officer and Tactical Medic Instructor Wren Nealy was named Tactical Officer of the Year.

In 2016, The CCEMS Lead Paramedic Instructor Rob Atripaldi was named the Texas EMS Educator of the Year In 2017, the CCEMS Communications Center was named Texas Telecommunicator of the Year.

In 2015 the American Heart Association recognized Cypress Creek EMS with a Gold Award for Severe Heart Attack Pre-Hospital Care.

CCEMS was voted and awarded National Paramedic System of the year in 1985.

Cypress Creek EMS is not in direct connection with Cypress Creek Volunteer Fire Department. They are however affiliates and CCEMS provides EMS services to the CCVFD area. There is a widespread misconception that the two services are one and the same.

== Education ==
The Charles R. Hooks Education Center located on Five Forks Dr, was a state of the art education facility that provided training programs for Emergency Care Attendants, EMT-Basic, and Paramedics.

Cypress Creek EMS offered first aid and CPR training through the American Heart Association for members of the public, and CPR, ACLS, and ACLS-EP training for medical professionals. CCEMS also taught continuing education courses, including classes sponsored by the National Association of EMTs.

CCEMS taught initial education courses for EMT-Basics and for paramedics, and in 2014, was awarded institutional accreditation by the Accrediting Bureau of Health Education Schools (ABHES) and subsequently received programmatic accreditation for the paramedic program through CAAHEP.

CCEMS hosted Public Safety Cycling courses sponsored by the International Police Mountain Biking Association (IPMBA), providing week-long training for police and EMS bicycle teams.

CCEMS also operated the Basic Tactical Operations Medical Support Course (BTOMSC), a well regarded intensive training program for EMS professionals supporting civilian law enforcement tactical operations teams. Firefighters, Police Officers and Medics come from all over the world to attend the twice a year training sessions.

== Communication Center ==
Cypress Creek EMS operated its own communication center, which served as a secondary PSAP, receiving 911 calls for fire or medical assistance, as well as dispatching fire, EMS, and law enforcement agencies. By 2021, the Cypress Creek EMS Communications Center serviced CCEMS EMS operations, sixteen Houston-area fire departments, and one Houston-area law enforcement agency.

The CCEMS Comm Center used the Field Response Guide by the National Academy of Emergency Medical Dispatch.

== Awards ==
- Best Advanced Life Support System in Texas – 1985
- Paramedic Emergency Medical Service of the Year for the United States – 1986
- Excellence in Health Care Award – 1995
- Texas EMS Provider of the Year – 2011
- Texas Medical Director of the Year – 2009, 2011
- American Heart Association Gold Award – 2015
- Fastest Door to Balloon Inflation Time – 2012, 2013, 2014, 2016 (Houston Methodist Hospital Willowbrook)
- Fastest Door to tPA Time for Stroke Care − 2012, 2013, 2014. 2015, 2016 (Houston Methodist Hospital Willowbrook)
- National Tactical Officers Association TEMS Award - 2015
- Texas EMS Educator of the Year - 2016
- Texas EMS Telecommunicator of the Year - 2017
