= Clear Creek High School =

Clear Creek High School may refer to:

- Clear Creek High School (Colorado) in Idaho Springs, Colorado
- Clear Creek High School (League City, Texas) in League City, Texas
- Clear Creek–Amana High School in Tiffin, Iowa
- Amanda-Clearcreek High School in Amanda, Ohio
- Springboro High School in Springboro, Ohio, now known as Springboro High School
