= Central Catholic High School =

Central Catholic High School may refer to:

- Central Catholic High School (Pittsburgh, Pennsylvania)
- Central Catholic High School (Modesto, California)
- Central Catholic High School (Bloomington, Illinois)
- Central Catholic High School (Morgan City, Louisiana)
- Central Catholic High School (Lawrence, Massachusetts)
- Central Catholic High School (Grand Island, Nebraska)
- Central Catholic High School (West Point, Nebraska)
- Central Catholic High School (Perry Township, Ohio)
- Central Catholic High School (Toledo, Ohio)
- Central Catholic High School (Portland, Oregon)
- Central Catholic High School (DuBois, Pennsylvania)

== Other schools ==
- Allentown Central Catholic High School, in Allentown, Pennsylvania
- Billings Central Catholic High School, in Billings, Montana
- Central Catholic Marianist High School, in San Antonio, Texas
- Cleveland Central Catholic High School in Cleveland, Ohio
- Detroit Catholic Central High School, in Novi, Michigan
- Great Falls Central Catholic High School, in Great Falls, Montana
- Greensburg Central Catholic High School, in Greensburg, Pennsylvania
- Lafayette Central Catholic Jr/Sr High School, in Lafayette, Indiana
- Newport Central Catholic High School, in Newport, Kentucky
- Reading Central Catholic High School, in Reading, Pennsylvania (merged with Holy Name High School)
- Tuscarawas Central Catholic High School, in New Philadelphia, Ohio
- Wheeling Central Catholic High School, in Wheeling, West Virginia

== See also ==
- Catholic Central High School (disambiguation)
- Central High School (disambiguation)
