= Spring Creek (San Jacinto River tributary) =

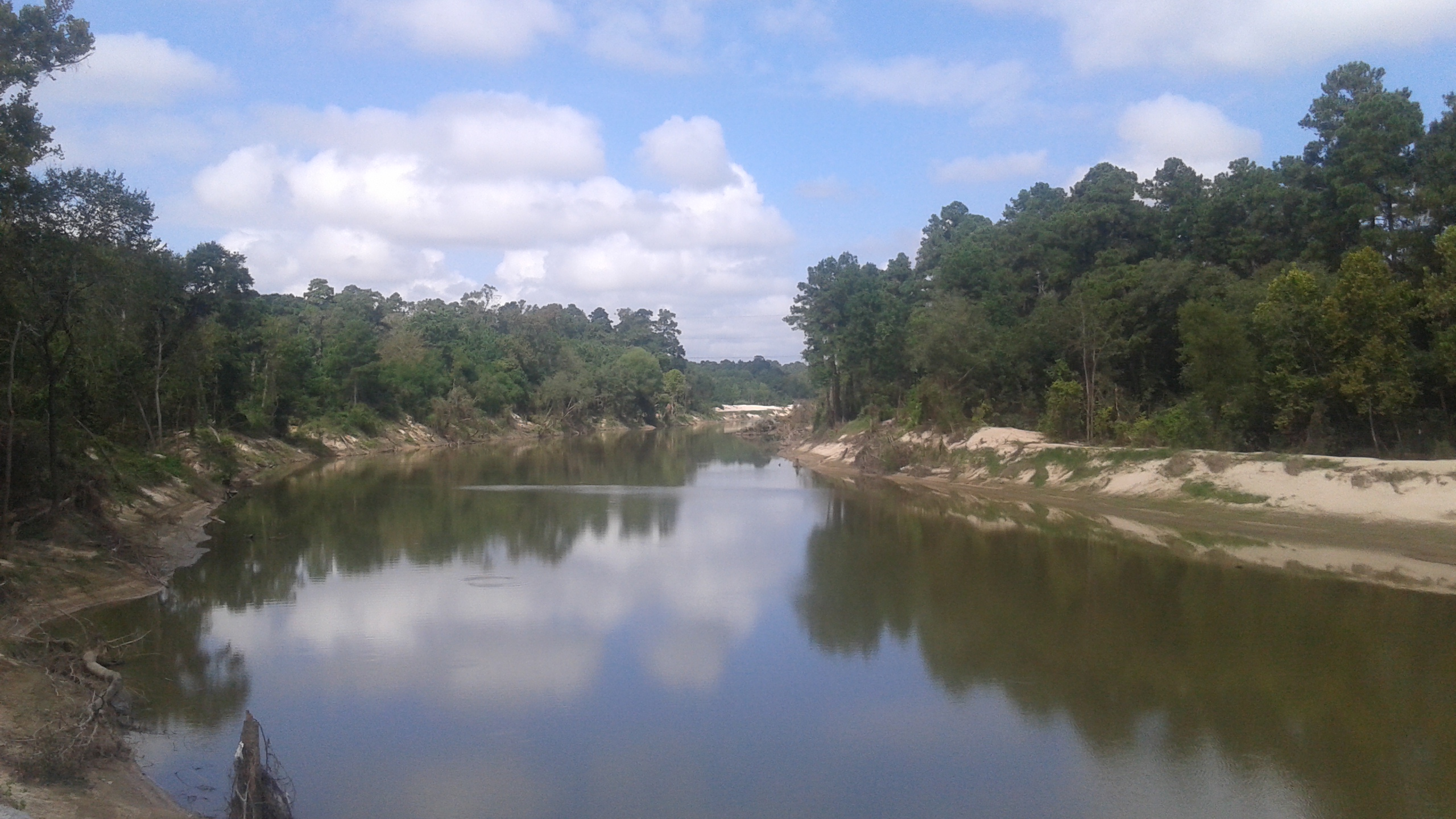
- Spring Creek between Pundt Park and Dennis Johnston Park

Location
- Country: United States
- State: Texas
- Region: Greater Houston

Physical characteristics
- Source: near Waller, Texas
  - coordinates: 30°07′19″N 095°52′28″W
- Mouth: west fork San Jacinto River
  - coordinates: 30°01′57″N 095°15′50″W

Spring Creek is a creek that divides Harris and Montgomery County in Southeast Texas. It is the only natural creek in both Harris and Montgomery County. The Creek flows into the west fork of the San Jacinto River west of Lake Houston. Spring Creek flows through the cities of Tomball, the northern part of Spring, The Woodlands, and Kingwood.

== Wildlife ==
Spring Creek is known for its sandy banks, undisturbed natural surroundings, and clean water, and it serves as home to many animals, including deer, otters, raccoons, opossums, and alligators. Many species of fish, including white bass, catfish, crappie, largemouth bass, and bluegill inhabit its waters. It is also known for its occasional Swainson's warbler sightings and for being the easternmost sighting of the green kingfisher, as well as bald eagles, herons, egrets, and other birds.

== See also ==
- List of rivers of Texas
