= Cypress Creek Preserve, Pasco County =

Coordinates: 28.1715°N 82.3519°W

Cypress Creek Preserve is a 255-acre (103 ha) area of protected land in Wesley Chapel, Pasco County, Florida. It is between Interstate 75 and State Road 56 to the north at 23999 County Line Road. Visits are by scheduled appointment. The lands include cypress and hardwood forests. They were acquired in 2010 and protect parts of Cypress Creek, a tributary of the Hillsborough River.
