= Campbell High School =

Campbell High School may refer to:

Australia

- Campbell High School (Canberra)

United States

- Campbell High School (California), Campbell, California
- Campbell High School (Georgia), Smyrna, Georgia
- Campbell High School (New Hampshire), Litchfield, New Hampshire
- Fort Campbell High School, located on the Tennessee side of Fort Campbell, a major U.S. Army base of the same name that straddles the Kentucky-Tennessee border
- James Campbell High School, Ewa Beach, Hawaii
- Campbell County High School (Kentucky), Alexandria, Kentucky
- Campbell High School in Rockwood, Tennessee, a former school for blacks
- Campbell County Comprehensive High School, Jacksboro, Tennessee
- Campbell High School (Texas), Campbell, Texas
- Campbell County High School (Wyoming), Gillette, Wyoming
