= Cypress Creek (Texas) =

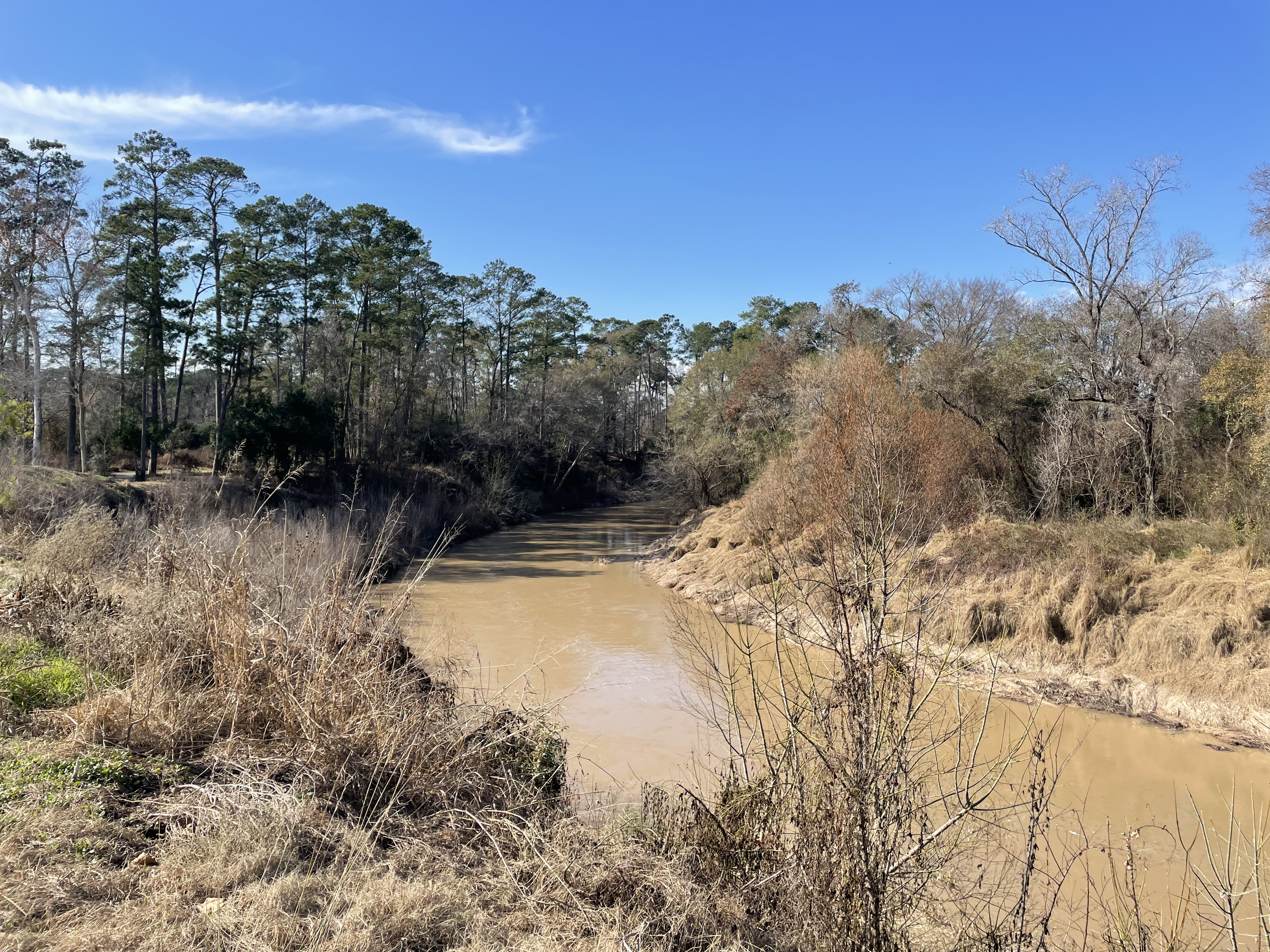

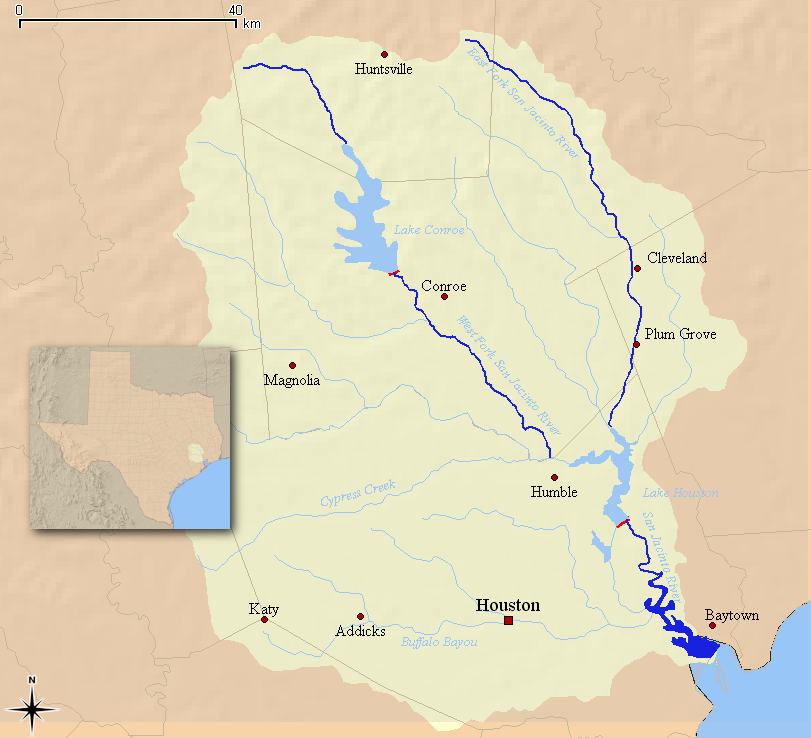
- Cypress Creek in the San Jacinto Watershed

- Location within Texas Location within the United States

Location
- Country: United States

Physical characteristics
- Source
  - location: Texas
  - coordinates: 29.9499462°N 95.8921752°W
- Mouth
  - location: Spring Creek
  - coordinates: 30.0327195°N 95.3116015°W
- Length: 49 mi (79 km)
- Basin size: San Jacinto River

Cypress Creek is a stream that flows from Snake Creek and Mound Creek in Waller County, Texas to its mouth at Spring Creek in Harris County, Texas. It is part of the Cypress Creek watershed, and flows into the west fork of the San Jacinto River watershed- eventually flowing to the Gulf of Mexico.

The banks of this creek were a settling location for German immigrants in the 1840s. The settlement was later named the city of Cypress, Texas.

Not to be confused with Cypress Creek (Texas) which flows through Wimberley, Texas

== See also ==
- List of rivers of Texas
