= Cypress Creek High School =

Cypress Creek High School may refer to:

- Cypress Creek High School (Orlando, Florida), a public high school in Orlando, Florida
- Cypress Creek High School (Wesley Chapel, Florida), a combined middle and high school in Wesley Chapel, Florida
- Cypress Creek High School (Texas), a public school in unincorporated Harris County, Texas, near Houston
