= Computerized Criminal History =

Computerized Criminal History

== FBI CCH ==
On December 10, 1970, the Attorney General decided that the FBI would take over management responsibility for the CCH system, rather than LEAA, a joint LEAA/FBI entity, or a consortium of States. The FBI named the system the Computerized Criminal History (CCH) program and operated it as part of NCIC, using NCIC computers and communication lines.

The CCH program began operations on November 29, 1971, joining wanted persons and stolen property files maintained in the NCIC. On an interim basis, the CCH file was to contain the detailed criminal history of each offender whose record was entered by the States into the system. Eventually, under the single- State/multi-State plan adopted by the FBI, NCIC/CCH would maintain only summary data in the form of an index of single-State offenders, while the States would maintain detailed records. For multi-State offenders and Federal offenders, NCIC/CCH would maintain the detailed records."

== CCH Alabama ==
"CCH (Computerized Criminal History System), an online database of criminal offender information available to qualified criminal justice agencies. CCH provides complete, statewide "rap sheets" on offenders, as well as a rapid flow of criminal offender information that aids criminal justice officials in making more realistic decisions with respect to bail, sentencing, probation, and parole. Alabama is an Interstate Identification Index (III) and Felon Identification in Firearms Sales (FIFS) participant."

== CCH Colorado ==
"The Computerized Criminal History (CCH) database contains detailed information of arrest records based upon fingerprints provided by Colorado law enforcement agencies. Arrests which are not supported by fingerprints will not be included in this database. Additionally, warrant information, sealed records, and juvenile records are not available to the public. To locate information regarding registered sex offenders, you must contact your local law enforcement agency."

== CCH Florida ==
The Falcon Project. "The Florida Department of Law Enforcement (FDLE), in its mission of promoting safety and protecting life, is a nationwide leader in information technology for preventing, investigating, solving, and prosecuting crimes. Its computerized criminal history records (CCH) represent the third largest state criminal history repository in the nation: over 4 million offenders, 15 million arrests. The CCH, along with an automated fingerprint repository (AFIS), has been an invaluable source of information for criminal justice agencies, government, and the public."

== CCH Georgia ==
"GCIC maintains Georgia's computerized criminal history database that includes the fingerprint and criminal history records of more than 2,600,000 persons. Georgia traditionally ranks among the top states in the nation, along with California, New York and Florida in the number of criminal fingerprint records processed each year."

== CCH Louisiana ==
"The Bureau of Criminal Identification and Information manages and oversees the Automated Fingerprint Identification System. AFIS is a statewide, automated fingerprint identification system, which is integrated with mugshot and computerized criminal history (CCH) information. The goal of this system is to provide real time identification of individuals at the time of booking, resulting in timely updates to the state's CCH, mugshot and fingerprint databases. All of this is accomplished in a paperless environment. The Bureau of Criminal Identification and Information provides operational management and technical assistance to the users of the system in addition to ensuring system operational compliance and quality control."

== CCH Minnesota ==
"The Computerized Criminal History (CCH) System is the State central repository for data on subjects arrested for felony, gross misdemeanor, enhanced misdemeanor and some misdemeanor offenses. It is used by the criminal justice community for decisions regarding investigations, arrests, bail/bond, criminal charges, plea bargains, convictions, probation, and placement in correctional facilities. It is also used during mandated background checks on individuals seeking employment or licensing for various positions. CCH also contains valuable information for researchers. "

== CCH New Jersey ==
"Presently, there are over four thousand New Jersey Criminal Justice Information System (NJCJIS) field terminals which access the Bureau's computerized criminal history files for arrest, prosecutorial, and custody information."

== CCH New York ==
"Source: New York State Division of Criminal Justice Services, Computerized Criminal History system. Includes all fingerprintable arrests for NY State Penal Law Article 221 offenses as the most serious charge in an arrest event. Ages 16 and older. 1978 data was used for 1977."

== CCH Oregon ==
"The Computerized Criminal History unit is responsible for maintaining criminal history information through LEDS (Law Enforcement Data System). The computerized criminal history is established based on fingerprints and includes arrest information, court information, and custody information received from the Department of Corrections. Law enforcement agencies are required by statute to submit a fingerprint card to ISS for all felony crimes as well as all sex and drug misdemeanor crimes."

== CCH South Dakota ==
The State's Computerized Criminal History (CCH) system contains data on subjects arrested for misdemeanors and felonies in South Dakota (per SDCL 23-5-1 and 4) that go through the State courts, along with all penitentiary entries and follow-up criminal information.

== CCH Texas ==
Chapter 66, Code of Criminal Procedure (CCP) defines the Computerized Criminal History System (CCH) as the statewide repository of criminal history data reported to 01691064 by local criminal justice agencies in Texas. CCH is one component of the Texas Criminal Justice Information System (CJIS). The other component of CJIS is the Corrections Tracking System (CTS) managed by the Criminal Record of Texas (DCJ).
