= John Knox Christian School =

John Knox Christian School, BC

Location
- Elementary Campus: 8260 13th Avenue Burnaby, Secondary Campus: 260 12th St New Westminster; Burnaby, New Westminster, British Columbia, V3N 2G5/V3M 4H2; Canada
- Coordinates: 49.2264°N 122.9201°W

Information
- School type: Independent School
- Religious affiliation: Christianity
- Founded: 1955
- Lead Principal: David Ward
- Principal: Adam Wasik
- Vice Principal: Jacob Rogers
- Faculty: Elementary: 73; Secondary: 47
- Grades: K-12
- Enrollment: Elementary: 447; Secondary: 255 (September 2021)
- Language: English
- Colours: Red and Grey
- Team name: Hawks
- Website: www.johnknoxbc.org

John Knox Christian School (JKCS) is a Christian independent K-12 school in Burnaby, British Columbia.

== Overview ==
John Knox Christian School has been providing Christian education in Burnaby since 1955. In 2018, John Knox started a high school, temporarily located at 7650 Sapperton Avenue, Burnaby. A new secondary campus was under construction at 260-12th Street, New Westminster. It opened in September 2019. All curriculum at John Knox is approved by the British Columbia Ministry of Education and is taught from a Christian perspective. It has a Fraser Institute rating of 9.5 out of 10 in 2019, ranking it 31st, and has 5 year average of 9.28 out of 10.

== History ==
In 1955, the school was founded by the New West Christian Reformed Church, a group of Dutch immigrants. It originally accommodated 65 K-7 students, 2 teachers, and a principal. The next year 103 students were enrolled. There have been multiple expansions to the elementary campus over the years, and in 2005 Carver Christian School was opened in partnership with Vancouver Christian School. In 2018, John Knox built their own highschool located at 260 12th Street.
