= Market Square Park =

Park in downtown Houston

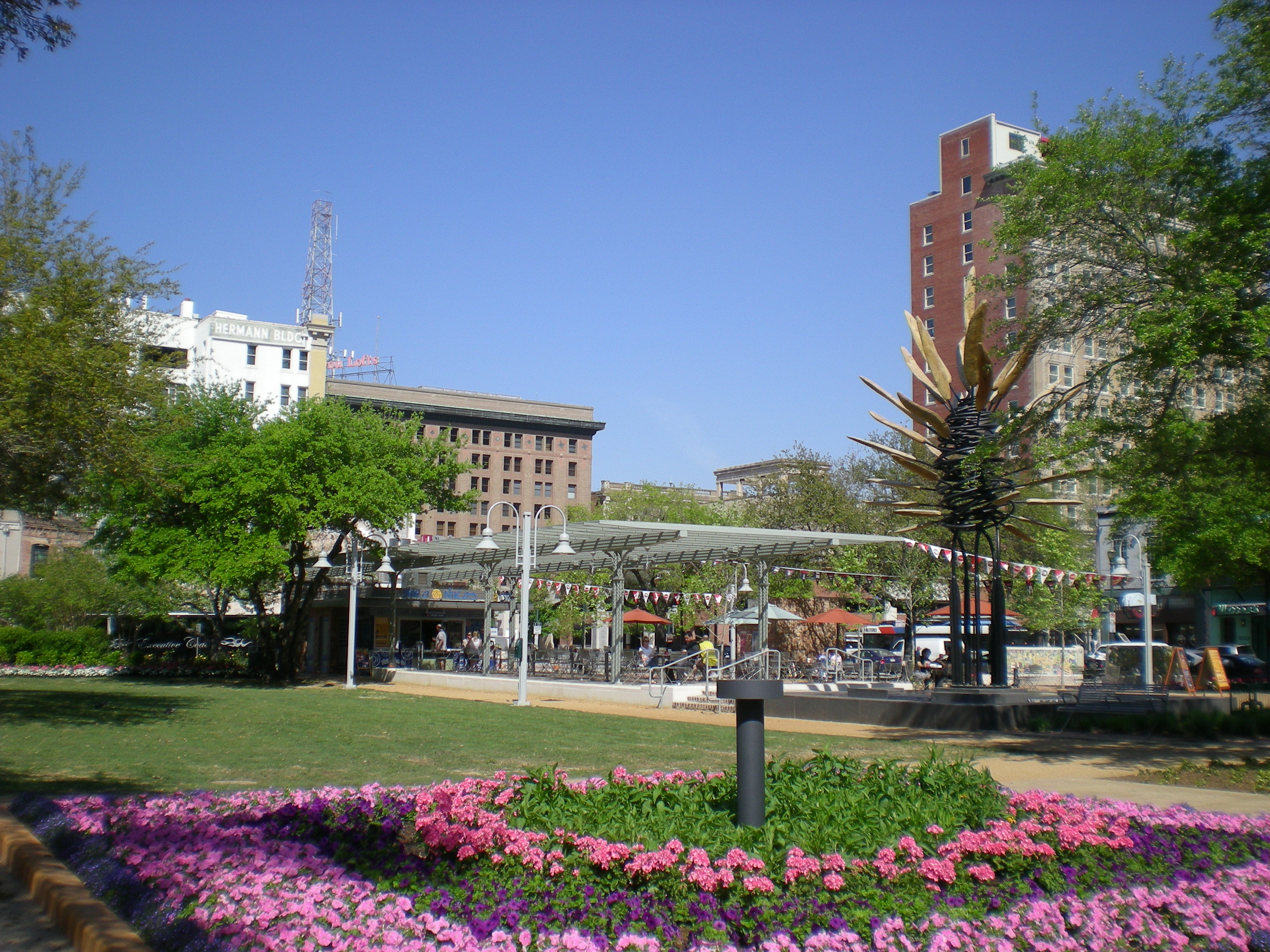
- Interactive map of Market Square Park
- Type: Municipal (Houston)
- Location: Downtown Houston
- Coordinates: 29.76266°N 95.36234°W
- Created: 1837 as public square
- Operator: Downtown Redevelopment Authority
- Status: Open year round

Market Square Park is a public park in Downtown Houston, Texas, United States. Originally set aside by the Houston Town Company as "Congress Square," the public square was used as a marketplace and city hall, which assumed the name, "Market Square." The City of Houston constructed four different market house/city halls, the first of which opened in 1840. The fourth was constructed in 1904. Market Square is a central feature of the Main Street/Market Square Historic District, a historic district listed on the National Register of Historic Places. The square is surrounded by a combination of nineteenth-century architecture and modern residential towers, with ground leases housing a variety of restaurants and bars.

== History ==
=== City halls and market houses ===
Market Square is a public plaza bounded by Travis and Milam streets, and Congress and Preston avenues. Numbered as Block 34 and named "Congress Square" in the original Borden Survey of Houston, it was renamed Market Square after Augustus Allen chose a site for the capitol at the northwest corner of Main Street and Texas Avenue in 1837.

Houston City Council commissioned its first market house and its first city hall on the square in 1840. The contractor for both buildings, Thomas Stansbury and Sons, completed both buildings the following year. The Houston Market House was a single-story rectangular building which faced Milam Street, a more convenient side of the square for the purveyors of rural produce. The first City Hall was a small cubic building crowned by a cupula, located toward the north side of the square.

The square was donated to the city in 1854 by Augustus Allen and used as an open air produce market. Very near Allen's Landing, the original port of Houston, the downtown business district grew around the square. Early city landmarks included the briefly used Texas Capitol and White House. In addition, several City Halls rose and fell at Market Square, each destroyed by fire.

Mayor Thomas Scanlan toured the east coast in 1871 for an inspection of various city halls in preparation for a new city hall and market house for Houston. The city hired Charles E. Hoare to design the new Italianate civic center, which included city offices, market stalls, and a theater. The project cost the city $400,000, but the 1873 building was consumed by a fire on July 8, 1976, leaving Houston with $182,500 of outstanding debt in its bond and only $82,500 in insurance payments.

In 1876, construction on a new city hall and market house began. Edwin J. Duhamel won the architectural design competition sponsored by Mayor Irvin Capers Lord, and the architect hired Britton and Long to construct the new civic house atop the old foundation. The city paid $100,000 for this new building, which was less elaborate in ornamentation and lacked a theater, but was similar in style to the 1873 Italianate City Hall and Market Place, and it was even larger.

After a fire claimed the 1876 City Hall and Market House in 1901, the city hired George E. Dickey to design a new civic center, the fourth on Market Square. The Dickey plan adhered to the building footprints of the third and fourth city hall/market houses and even retained the restored bell and clocks. Yet the 1904 civic center reflected Victorian eclecticism in style.

=== Lauren’s Garden ===
Former Houston-area resident, Lauren Catuzzi Grandolas, was killed on board United Airlines Flight 93 during the September 11 attacks. A memorial bust figure of her is positioned next to a water feature and plaque created in her honor at the Congress Street side of the park.

== Facing Market Square ==
Market Square lies within the Main Street Market Square District, so designated by the City of Houston in 1997 and listed by the National Register of Historic Places in 1983. Three nineteenth-century buildings face Market Square: the Kennedy Bakery Building at 813 Congress Avenue, the home of La Carafe; the Fox-Kuhlman Building at 305–307 Travis Street; and the Baker-Meyer Building, at 315 Travis.

Market Square Tower at 777 Preston opened in 2017. The 43-floor glass-clad tower houses a combination of residential and guest apartments, a full commercial kitchen, a ballroom, and a top-floor with a bar and a pool.

== Gallery ==
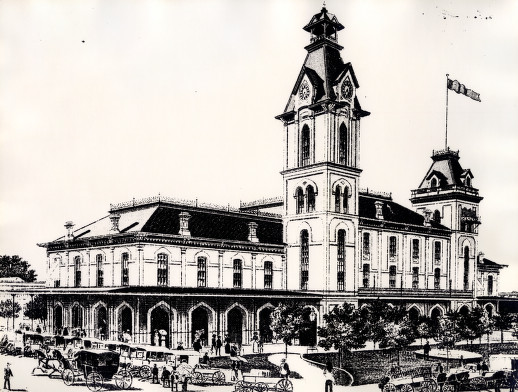
City Hall and Market House

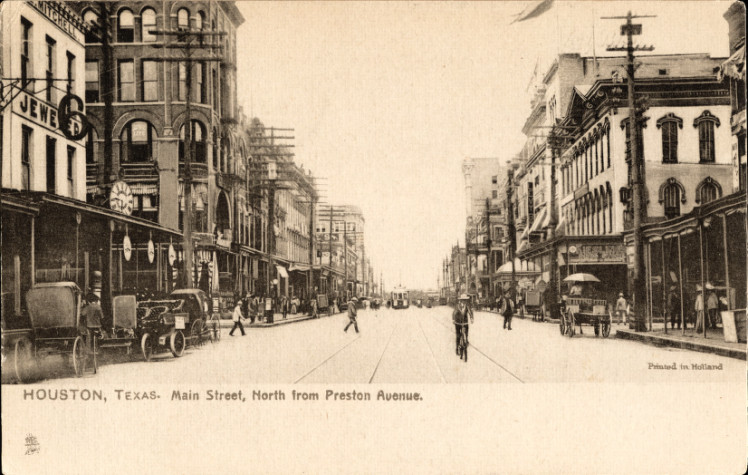
Main Street, north from Preston Avenue, Houston, Texas (postcard, c. 1905–07)

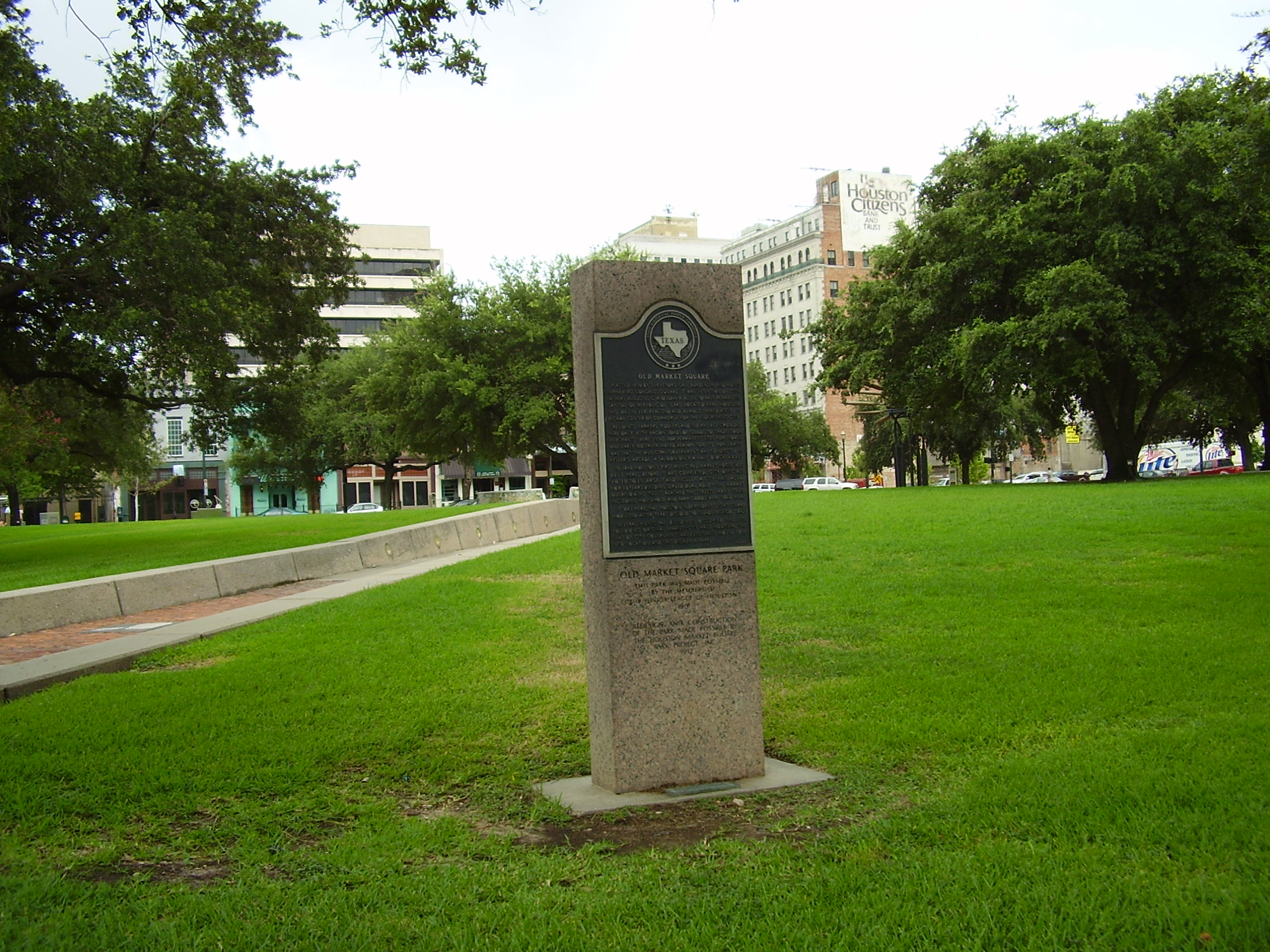
Monument for "Old Market Square Park," Houston

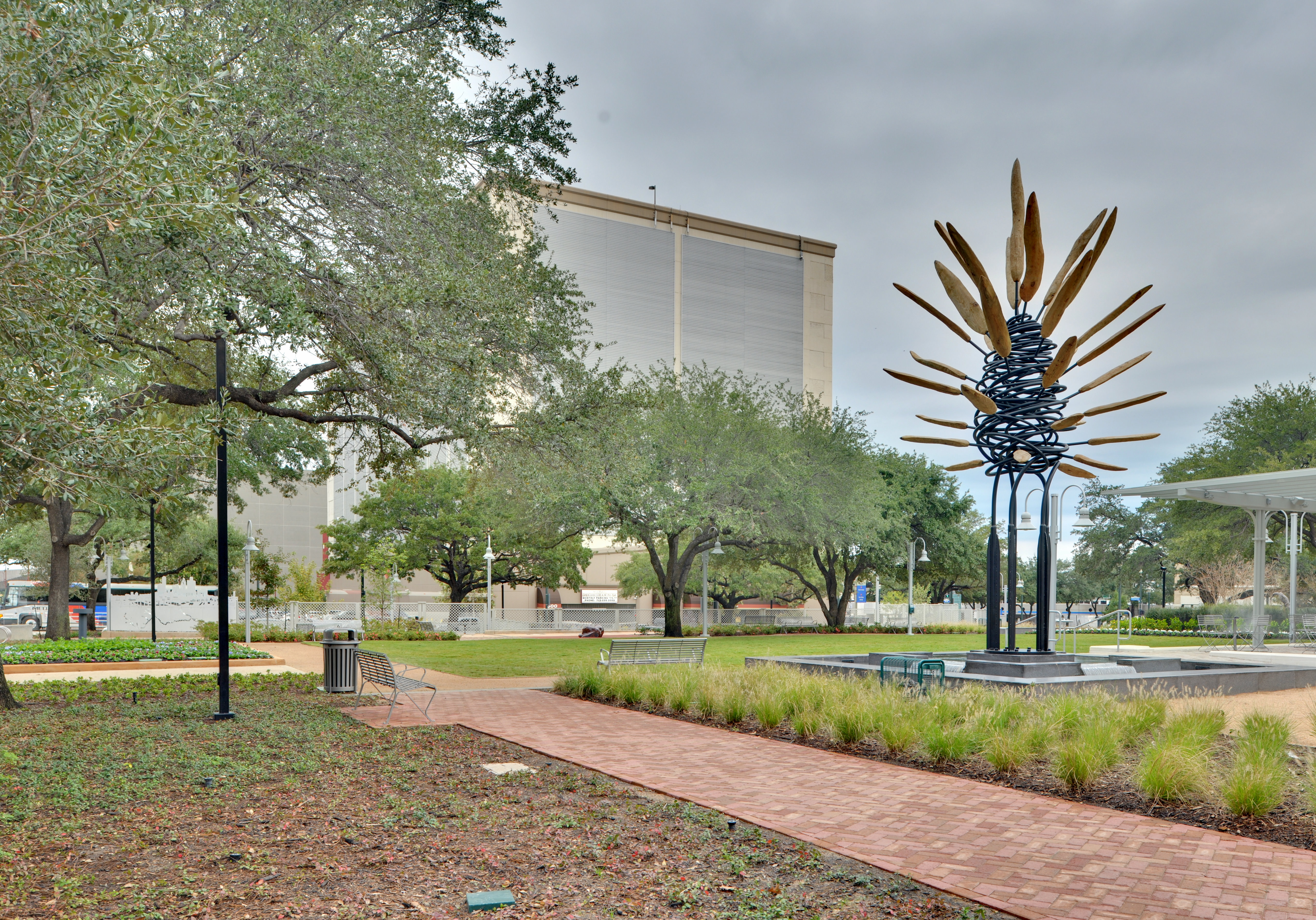
View toward Milam Street from Market Square Park, Houston

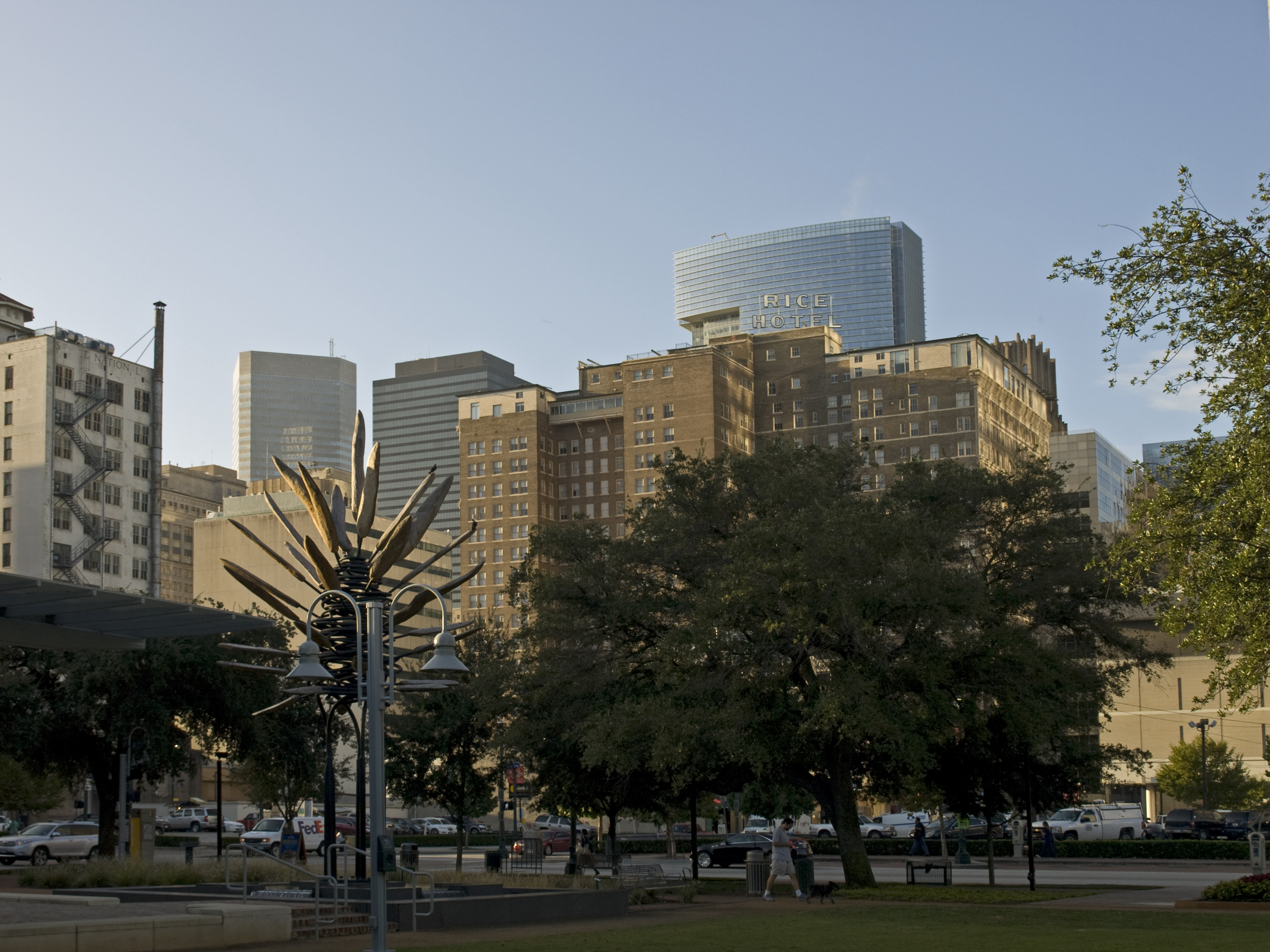
The Rice Hotel (Post Rice Lofts) viewed from Market Square, Houston

== See also ==
- Points of View by James Surls, installed in the park

== Bibliography ==
- Bradley, Barrie Scardino (2020). Improbable Metropolis: Houston's Architectural and Urban History. Austin: University of Texas Press. ISBN 978-1-4773-2019-8.
- Glass, James L. (1994). "The Original Book of Sales of Lots in the Houston Town Company from 1836 Forward" (PDF). Houston Review. 16 (3).
- Scardino, Barrie (1982). "A Legacy of City Halls for Houston" (PDF). Houston Review. 4 (2).
