= Houston Dragon Boat Festival =

Annual boat race

- Genre: dragon boat racing
- Dates: first weekend of May
- Locations: Buffalo Bayou, Houston, Texas
- Years active: 2001–2019
- Website: http://www.texasdragonboat.com

The Houston Dragon Boat Festival is held in Houston, Texas. The Houston Dragon Boat Festival is a race down Buffalo Bayou, using decorated canoes called "dragon boats".

== History ==
The first festival was held in October 2001 at Allen's Landing in downtown Houston. In 2004, the festival added a second event – the Gulf Coast International Dragon Boat Regatta held in October at Clear Lake Park. 2005 saw the festival host the U.S. Central Region Championships in conjunction with the Gulf Coast International regatta.

== Boathouse ==
The Texas Dragon Association plans to build the first boathouse along the downtown Bayou for non-motor boat craft. The Houston Endowment donated $75,000 to build the boathouse at 501 N. York Street.
