= Merchants and Manufacturers Building =

Historic building in Houston, Texas, U.S.

Coordinates: 29.76362°N 95.36032°W

- U.S. National Register of Historic Places
- U.S. Historic district – Contributing property
- Recorded Texas Historic Landmark
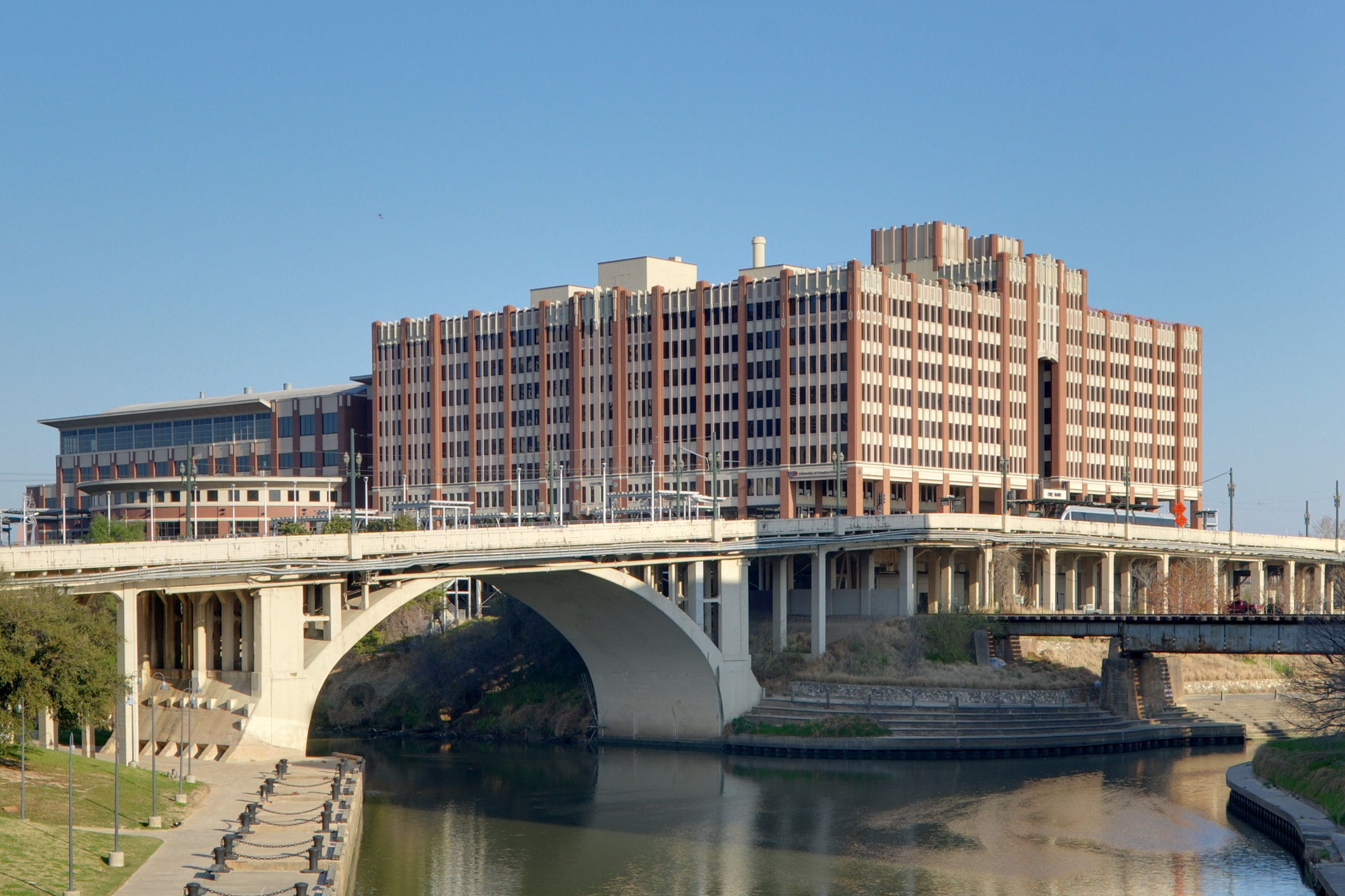
- The M&M Building

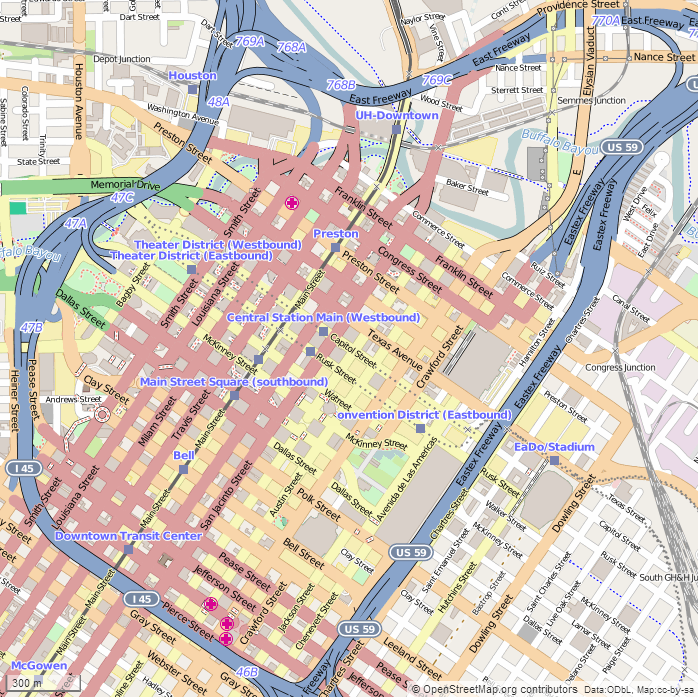
- Location within Houston Downtown Location within Texas Location within the United States
- Location: 1 Main St; Houston, TX 77002
- Built: 1930
- Architect: Giesecke & Harris
- Architectural style: Art Deco
- Part of: Main Street/Market Square Historic District
- NRHP reference No.: 80004130
- RTHL No.: 10729

Significant dates
- Added to NRHP: September 17, 1980
- Designated RTHL: 1984

The One Main Building, formerly the Merchants and Manufacturers Building (commonly referred to as the M&M Building), is a building on the campus of the University of Houston–Downtown. The building is recognized as part of the National Register of Historic Places, is a Recorded Texas Historic Landmark, and considered a Contributing Building in Downtown Houston's Main Street/Market Square Historic District. The building was built above Allen's Landing—an area where Houston's founders John Kirby Allen and Augustus Chapman Allen originally settled.

The Merchants and Manufacturers Building was built in 1930 and was the largest building in the city at the time. Although the commerce-focused building featured 14 miles of floor space and could accommodate one-third of the city's population, the Great Depression in the United States stifled initial participation. The building was purchased by South Texas Junior College in the 1960s, which became the university of Houston–Downtown College in 1974.

The building remains as the largest facility of the University of Houston–Downtown and was given an official designation as "One Main Building," or simply the "Main Building," by the university.
