= Rocky Hill (musician) =

American blues guitarist and singer (1946–2009)

- Born: John Rockford Hill; December 1, 1946
- Origin: Dallas, Texas, United States
- Died: April 10, 2009 (aged 62) Houston, Texas, United States
- Genres: Blues
- Instrument: Guitar
- Formerly of: American Blues

John Rockford "Rocky" Hill (December 1, 1946 – April 10, 2009) was an American blues guitarist, singer, and bassist from Dallas, Texas, United States. Hill was the older brother of ZZ Top bassist, Dusty Hill.

== Biography ==
Hill was a member of the 1960s acid rock and blues group American Blues with his brother Dusty and drummer Frank Beard. Before the formation of ZZ Top, Rocky left the trio and subsequently played in blues bands for John Lee Hooker, Lightnin' Hopkins (for whom he played bass), Freddie King, and Jimmy Reed.

In 1982, he released his first solo album, Texas Shuffle (reissued in 2005) which featured Johnny Winter and Dr. John. In 1988, Virgin Records released Hill's eponymous album produced by ZZ Top's manager and producer Bill Ham.

Hill, a self-styled "anti-Clapton", was called "a monster on guitar" and "perhaps the wildest and scariest—both on stage and off—of all the white-boy Texas blues guitarists" and was noted in particular for his "metal-melting tone and whistling, artillery-shell harmonics".

Hill died on April 10, 2009, aged 62.

== Discography ==
=== Albums ===
- Texas Shuffle (1982)
- Rocky Hill (1988)
- Midnight Creepers (1994)
- Lone Star Legend (released 2012, recorded 1977)

=== Guest appearances ===
- "German Mustard" (1972) – track three on The Late Great Townes Van Zandt
- Extended Play (1973) – four track EP by Don Sanders
- "The Real Good Thing" (2006) – track 5 on the album Straight Ahead by Joe Miranda and the Wildcatters
