= Points of View (Surls) =

1991 sculpture by James Surls in Houston, Texas, U.S.

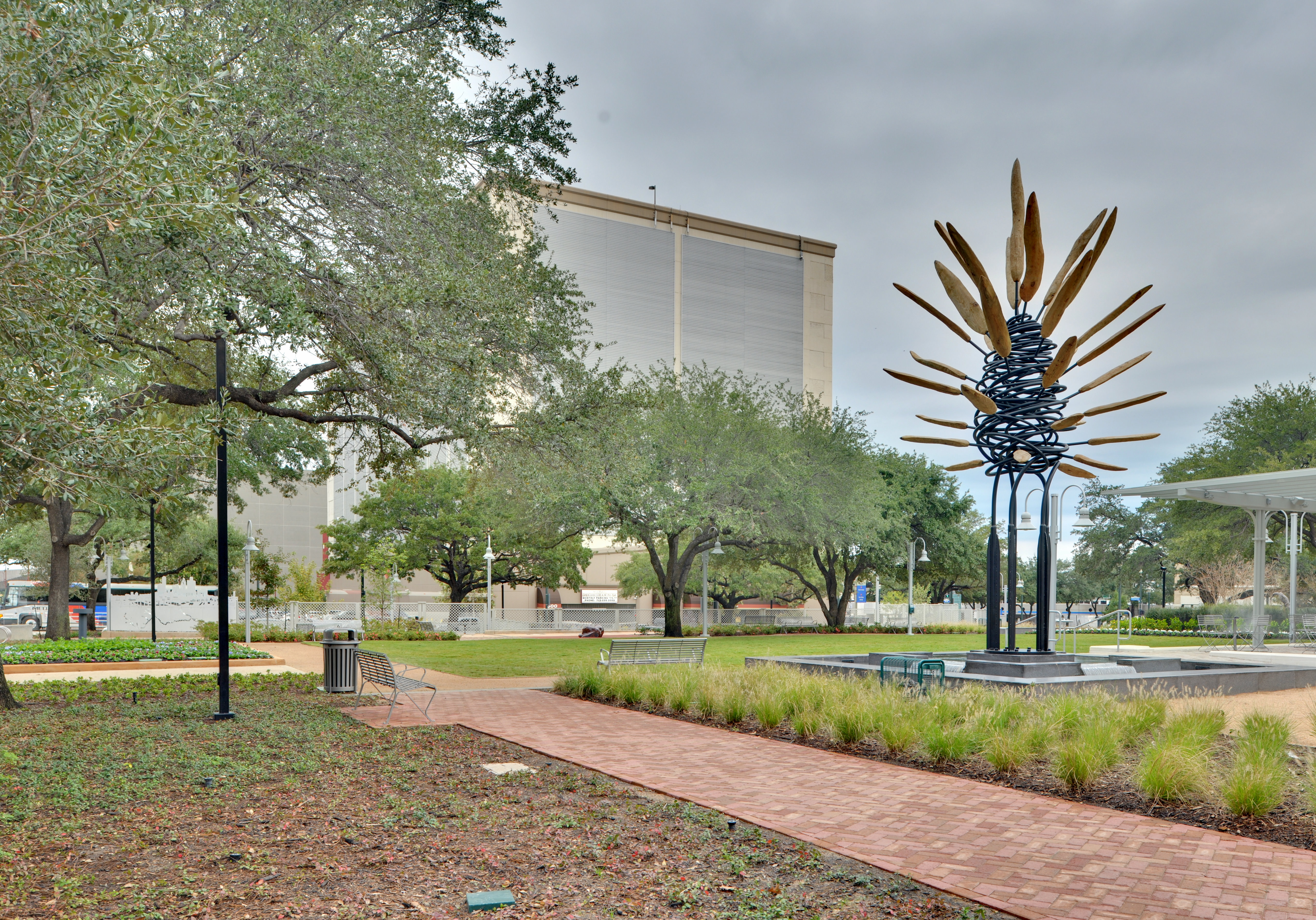
- The sculpture in 2010
- Artist: James Surls
- Year: 1991
- Type: Sculpture
- Medium: Pine (wood), steel
- Dimensions: 7.6 m × 2.4 m × 1.2 m (25 ft × 8 ft × 4 ft)
- Location: Houston, Texas, United States; 29.76246°N 95.362295°W

Points of View is an outdoor 1991 sculpture by James Surls, installed at Market Square Park in Houston, Texas, in the United States. The abstract sculpture is made of treated pine and painted steel, and measures 25 feet (7.6 m) x 8 feet (2.4 m) x 4 feet (1.2 m). It is mounted on a concrete base that measures 3 inches (7.6 cm) x 54 inches (140 cm). The work was dedicated in 1992, following Market Square Park's renovation during 1991–1992.

== See also ==
- 1991 in art
- List of public art in Houston
