= American Blues =

American rock band

- Genres: Psychedelic rock; blues rock; garage rock
- Years active: 1966–1968
- Spinoffs: ZZ Top
- Past members: Dusty Hill; Frank Beard; Rocky Hill

American Blues was an American 1960s Texas-based rock band which played a psychedelic style of blues rock music influenced by the 13th Floor Elevators. They are most notable for including two future members of the band ZZ Top in their ranks, Dusty Hill and Frank Beard. From 1966 to 1968, they played the Dallas-Fort Worth-Houston circuit and headlined in three clubs all called "The Cellar", in Dallas at clubs such as "The Walrus" on Mockingbird Lane, and in Houston at "Love Street Light Circus Feel Good Machine" on Allen's Landing, as late as 1968. In 1968, they released the album American Blues 'Is Here', featuring Hill, Hill, Davis, and Beard.

Around 1968, the band (the two Hill brothers and Beard) decided to leave the Dallas–Fort Worth area, relocating to Houston. At this time, however, guitarist Rocky Hill wanted to focus on "straight blues", while his brother Dusty wanted the band to rock more. Rocky left the band, and the remaining two members joined the recently formed ZZ Top.

Rocky Hill continued to tour around Texas and elsewhere, becoming one of a number of guitarists well known within the state for their blues guitar prowess, such as Rocky Athis and Charlie Sexton. He sometimes referred to himself as "The Anti-Clapton", and one writer with the Houston Press called Rocky "perhaps the wildest and scariest – both onstage and off – of all the Texas white-boy blues guitarists."

== Members ==
- Rocky Hill – guitar
- Dusty Hill – bass
- Richard Harris – drums
- Doug Davis – piano on "Mellow"
- Frank Beard – drums
- Rick Steed – drums

== Albums ==
- American Blues 'Is Here' 1968
- American Blues 'Do Their Thing' 1968
