= Diane Falkenhagen =

American artist and metalsmith

- Education: University of North Texas, University of Houston
- Occupations: artist, metalsmith, jeweler
- Website: dianefalkenhagen.com

Diane Falkenhagen is an American artist, she is known as a metalsmith and creates mixed-media custom jewelry which incorporates two dimensional imagery. She is based in Texas.

== Early life and education ==
In 1977, she received her B.F.A. degree from the University of North Texas and in 1981 she received her M.F.A. degree from the University of Houston. At University of Houston, she studied sculpture under James Surls and John Alexander.

== Career ==
For more than three decades Diane Falkenhagen has been creating and exhibiting art jewelry. A native Texan, Falkenhagen lives and works on west Galveston Island.

Between 1992 and 1995, she lived in Brazil. Her time living in Brazil is reflected in her use of Latin American folklore in some of her art.

Falkenhagen’s jewelry is held in private collections and is exhibited all over the world. Some of her work had been featured in the publications American Craft, Metalsmith, Ornament, Southwest Art, The New York Times, and the books: Color on Metal, 500 Brooches and 500 Necklaces.

After Hurricane Ike in 2008 inundated her West Galveston Island studio she received a CERF+ Emergency Grant and CERF+ Emergency Recovery Loan.

She is best known for her mixed media jewelry in which she transforms 2-D images into 3-D objects. The images serve the same purpose in the pieces as a gemstone would, drawing the viewer in and focusing their attention. Her images and inspiration come from art history, iconography, metaphor, and memory. She has also been inspired by the artist, Rene Magritte. One of her favorite forms of jewelry to create are brooches, "because there are fewer restrictions," and much of her work is done in series based on a central theme. Many of her brooches have a "narrative" where the jewelry is meant to convey part of a story. In some of her jewelry, she uses images of reproductions of paintings which she transfers onto polymer clay. The reproductions are further "enhanced" with colored pencils and then framed in various metal designs created by Falkenhagen. Falkenhagen also uses hard wax in her surface treatments of her transferred images.

== Affiliations ==
In 1996, she was elected to the Board of Directors of the Society of North American Goldsmiths (SNAG). Falkenhagen began teaching jewelry-making as early as 1979 in Galveston.

She runs workshops and lectures around the country and is an assistant professor at the University of Houston. She is also a former member of the editorial advisory committee of Metalsmith magazine. She started teaching at Galveston College in 1981 and remained there till 1992, when she moved to Rio de Janeiro.

Her work was shown at Pittsburgh's Society for Contemporary Craft in Transforamtion 8: Contemporary Works in Small Metals in 2012.
