= Sweeney, Coombs, and Fredericks Building =

Historic building in Houston, Texas, U.S.

- Sweeney, Coombs and Fredericks Building
- U.S. National Register of Historic Places
- Recorded Texas Historic Landmark
- Texas State Antiquities Landmark
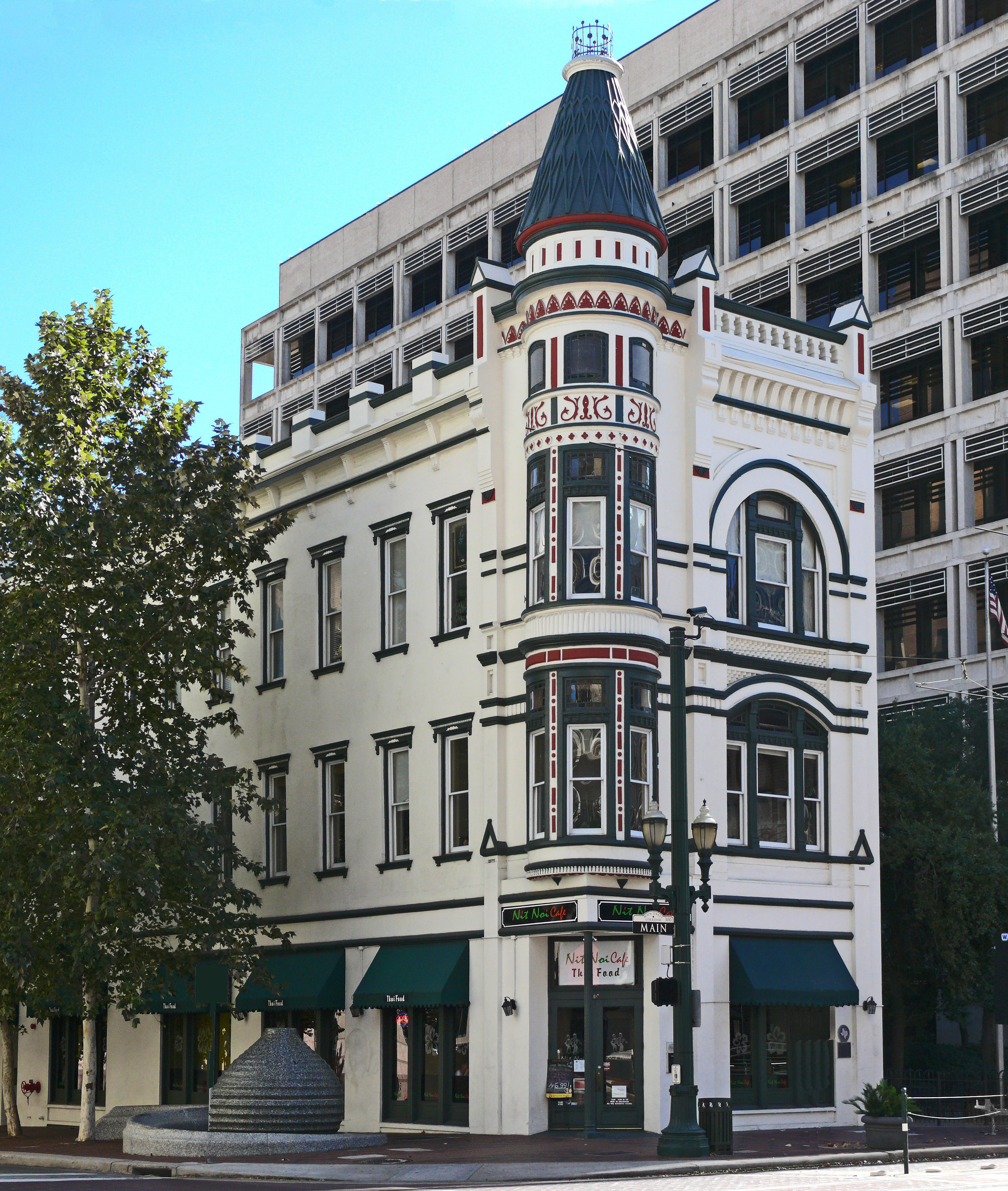
- View facing south

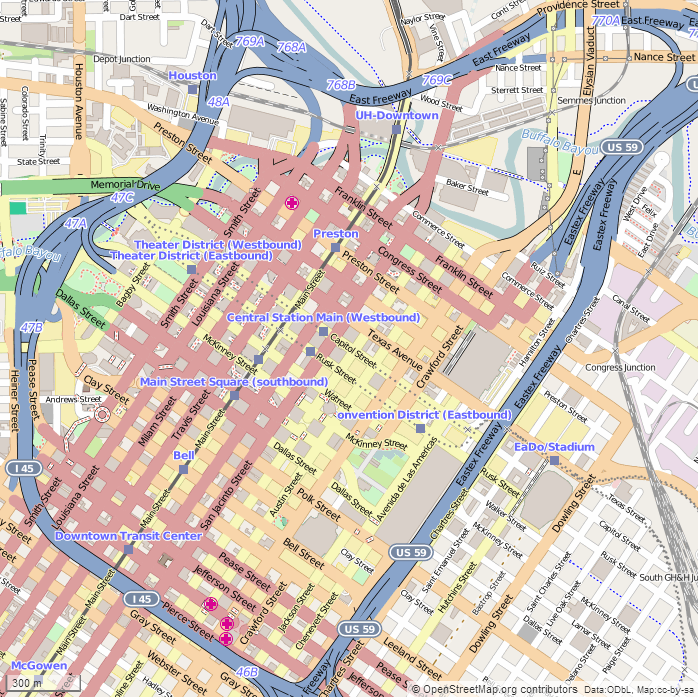
- Location within Houston Downtown Location within Texas Location within the United States
- Location: 301 Main Street @ Congress; Houston, Texas; United States
- Coordinates: 29.7620°N 95.3606°W
- Built: 1889
- Architect: George E. Dickey
- Architectural style: Victorian
- NRHP reference No.: 74002074
- RTHL No.: 10786
- TSAL No.: 335

Significant dates
- Added to NRHP: June 23, 1978
- Designated RTHL: 1974
- Designated TSAL: 5/28/1981

The Sweeney, Coombs, and Fredericks Building is a late Victorian commercial building with a 3-story corner turret and Eastlake decorative elements that was designed by George E. Dickey in 1889. The building is located at 301 Main Street in Houston, Texas and occupies the corner of Main Street and Congress Street in Downtown Houston. The building is one of the few Victorian-style architectural structures that remain in the city. The building received a "City of Houston Landmark" designation in 2009. The building is included in the National Register of Historic Places by virtue of being a conforming structure in the Main Street/Market Square Historic District. It is formerly the home of restaurant Cava Bistro.

== Location ==
The Sweeney, Coombs and Fredericks Building shares a 75-year ground lease from Harris County and adjacent to the historic Pillot Building. The building lies within the boundaries of Houston's Main Street/Market Square Historic District. Market Square, the namesake for the historic district, is just one block away on Congress Street.

== Purchase, development, and construction ==
=== Purchase ===
In 1882, John Jasper Sweeney and Edward L. Coombs commissioned the purchase of an 1861 building built by William A. Van Alstyne, the W.A. Van Alstyne Building.

=== Construction ===
Historical records indicate that the W. A. Van Alstyne Building was set to be demolished and replaced by the Sweeney and Coombs structure. Speculation remains as to whether the demolition of the W. A. Van Alstyne Building was ever completed; some theorists believe that the W. A. Van Alstyne Building was incorporated by renovation into the structure built by Sweeney and Coombs.

Construction of the building was completed in 1887.

=== Design ===
The building was designed by George E. Dickey and the style of the building reflects the Victorian Era of architecture. Design elements included a 3-story corner turret and Eastlake decorative elements. The decorative angled doors of the building are set facing the intersection of 220 Main Street.

=== Renovations ===
The building underwent a modest renovation in 1968, which preserved the exposed brick walls and original hardwood floors.

== Ownership ==
Gus Fredericks joined the Sweeney and Coombs Jewelry firm before 1889. The jewelry firm is still in business.

In 1974, Harris County acquired the building through condemnation.

The Environmental Practice Group of the Harris County Attorney’s Office occupies the 2nd floor and a portion of the County Auditor’s Office occupies the third.

== See also ==
- National Register of Historic Places listings in Harris County, Texas
