= South Texas Junior College =

Junior college in Houston, Texas

- Type: Private, junior college
- Active: 1948–1974
- Affiliations: YMCA (1948–1967)
- President: William I. Dykes (1972–1974)
- Students: 2,737 (1973)
- Location: Houston, Texas, United States
- Nickname: Seahawks
- Sporting affiliations: Texas Junior College Athletic Conference (TJCAC)

South Texas Junior College (STJC) was a junior college located in Houston, Texas (USA).

The YMCA opened STJC in 1948 and operated the two-year coeducational liberal arts school; no tax money supported the school. The YMCA pioneered the concept of night school, providing educational opportunities for people with full-time employment.

At first classes occurred in the old Downtown YMCA building at 1600 Louisiana. In 1949, the school had 144 students. The South Texas College of Law, also under the YMCA umbrella, dominated most of the funding and attention of the college before the two groups decoupled in the mid-1960s. As part of this, classes moved to the Merchants and Manufacturers Building at One Main Street in 1967, when STJC ended its affiliation with the YMCA. Two years later, under President W.I. Dykes, the college bought the Merchants and Manufacturers Building outright and took over most of the building for classes and administration. Enrollment dropped, however, throughout the late 1960s and early 1970s, from an all-time high of nearly 5,000 students to 2,737 students and 120 faculty members by 1973. The YMCA and YWCA buildings provided dormitories for students. At one time it was the largest private junior college in the United States, and in 1974, still ranked among the top ten.

On August 6, 1974, the University of Houston acquired the assets of South Texas Junior College and opened the University of Houston–Downtown College as a four-year institution.
