= White Oak Bayou =

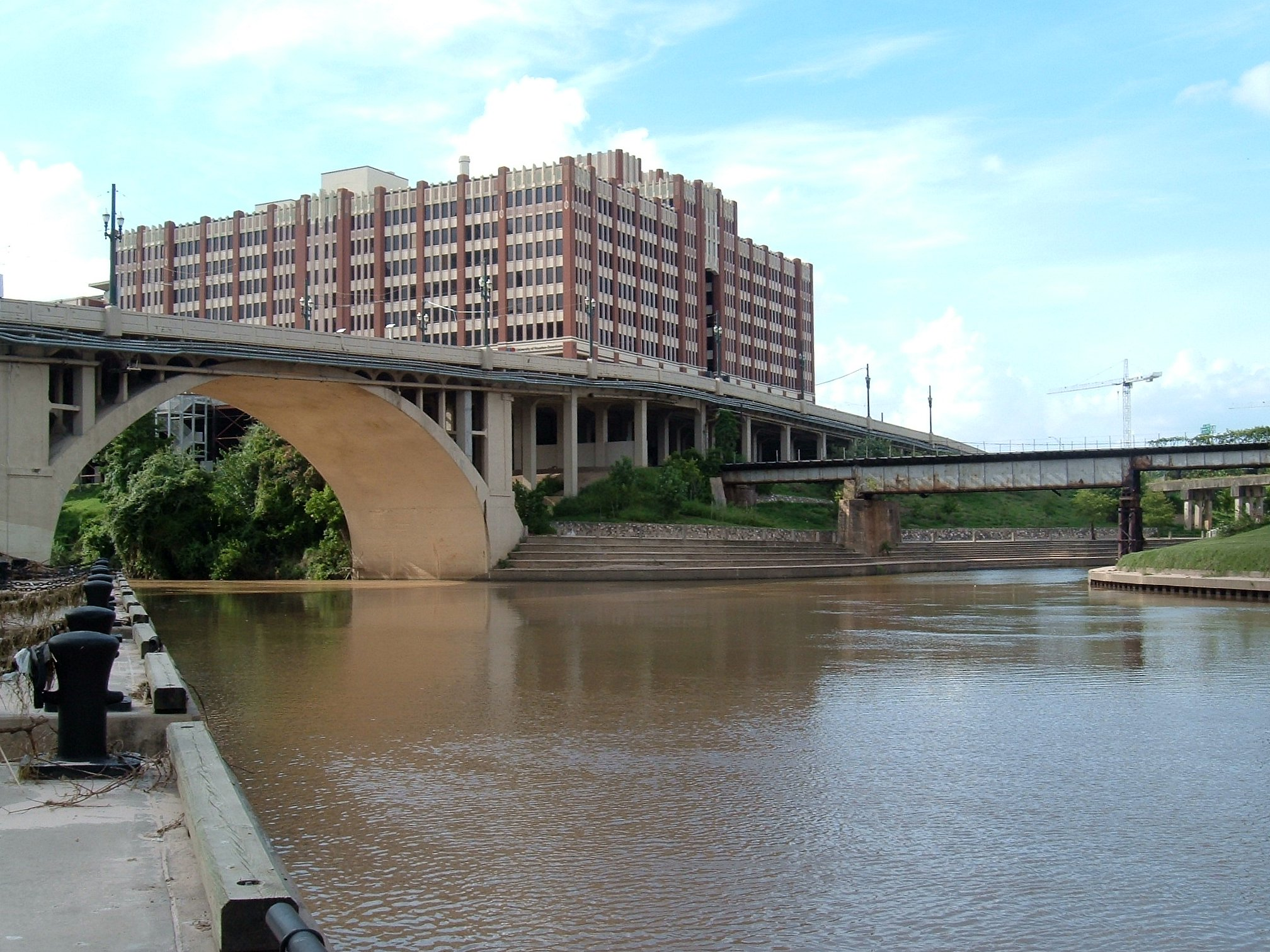
- White Oak Bayou and Buffalo Bayou at Allen's Landing, with the University of Houston–Downtown in the distance.

Location
- Country: United States
- County: Harris
- City: Houston

Physical characteristics
- Source: Drainage ditch
  - location: Jersey Village, Texas
  - coordinates: 29°53′14″N 95°35′07″W
- Mouth: Buffalo Bayou
  - location: Allen's Landing
  - coordinates: 29°45′54″N 95°21′31″W
- Length: 25 miles (40 km)
- Basin size: 111 square miles (290 km^{2})

Basin features
- Population: 430,000
- Tributaries
  - left: Little Whiteoak Bayou, Vogel Creek
  - right: Cole Creek

White Oak Bayou is a slow-moving river in Houston, Texas. A major tributary of the city's principal waterway, Buffalo Bayou, White Oak originates near the intersection of Texas State Highway 6 and U.S. Highway 290 (the Northwest Freeway) and meanders southeast for 25 miles (40 km) until it joins Buffalo Bayou in Downtown. The river serves as a greenway which connects Downtown to the Houston Heights, Oak Forest, Garden Oaks, and Inwood Forest.

A large majority of White Oak Bayou's route travels through highly developed areas. The river's 111-square-mile (290 km^{2}) watershed contains a population of over 430,000.

== Watershed ==
White Oak Bayou drains areas throughout the northwest portions of Harris County as well as the City of Jersey Village and portions of the City of Houston. Its watershed covers 111 square miles (290 km^{2}) and includes three primary streams: White Oak Bayou, Little White Oak Bayou and Cole Creek. In addition, Vogel Creek and Brickhouse Gully are among the major tributaries in the watershed. In all, there are about 151 miles (243 km) of open streams in the White Oak Bayou watershed, including the primary and tributary channels.

Wildlife habitat exists on much of the undeveloped tracts scattered throughout the watershed and has been preserved and/or created in several of the large regional stormwater detention basins constructed by the Harris County Flood Control. However, only a little undisturbed wildlife habitat exists along the urban channels of White Oak Bayou and its tributaries.

== History ==
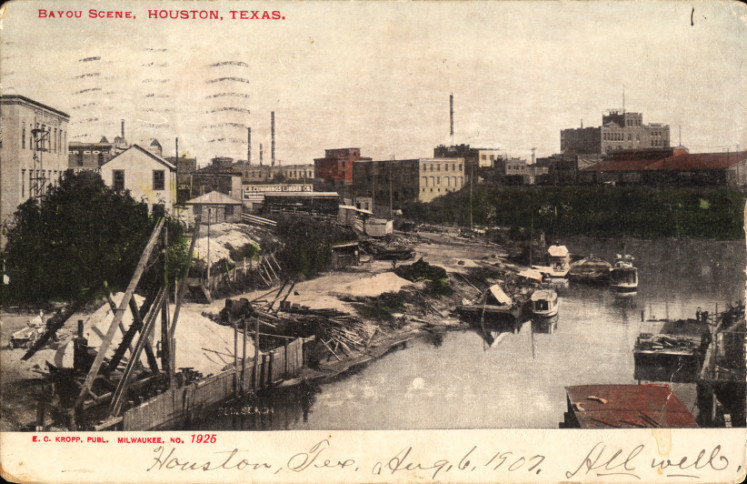
Postcard of Bayou (circa 1907)

The original Port of Houston was located at the confluence of White Oak Bayou and Buffalo Bayou in what is now downtown Houston by the University of Houston–Downtown. This area is called "Allen's Landing" and is the official birthplace of Houston, Texas. The landing is now designated as a historical city park.

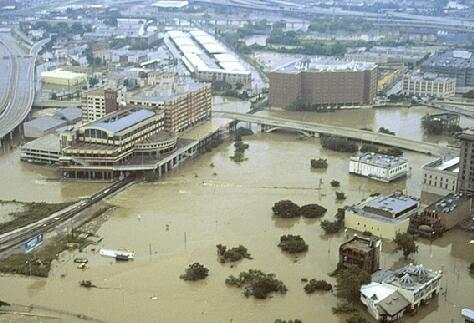
White Oak and Buffalo Bayous at Main St. after Tropical Storm Allison, June 2001

Near a bend in White Oak Bayou, where Houston's First and Sixth wards meet, lies Olivewood Cemetery, the historic 6-acre (24,000 m^{2}) resting place for many freed slaves and some of Houston's earliest black residents. Established in 1877, it is the oldest graveyard for African Americans in the Houston area.

In early June 2001, the Bayou caused at least three of 17 Houston-area deaths attributed to Tropical Storm Allison, when it raged out of its banks, as the maximum rainfall from Allison that fell on June 8 and 9 was shifted primarily over the White Oak Bayou watershed. Its tributary, Little White Oak Bayou, accounted for another two deaths.

== Parkland and trails ==
The West White Oak Bayou Trail runs along the banks of the bayou, parallel to T. C. Jester Boulevard, from 11th Street to Antoine St, providing bicyclists and pedestrians a 7.4-mile (11.9 km) long mostly concrete and asphalt trail (the portion just South of Little York to Antoine has been repaved and extended, and White Oak Bayou Village trail head sits on this portion of the trail. Passing through several parks, the trail is lighted and includes protective railings in some areas. In 2006, the Houston Press named the West White Oak Bayou Trail the best bike path in the City of Houston.

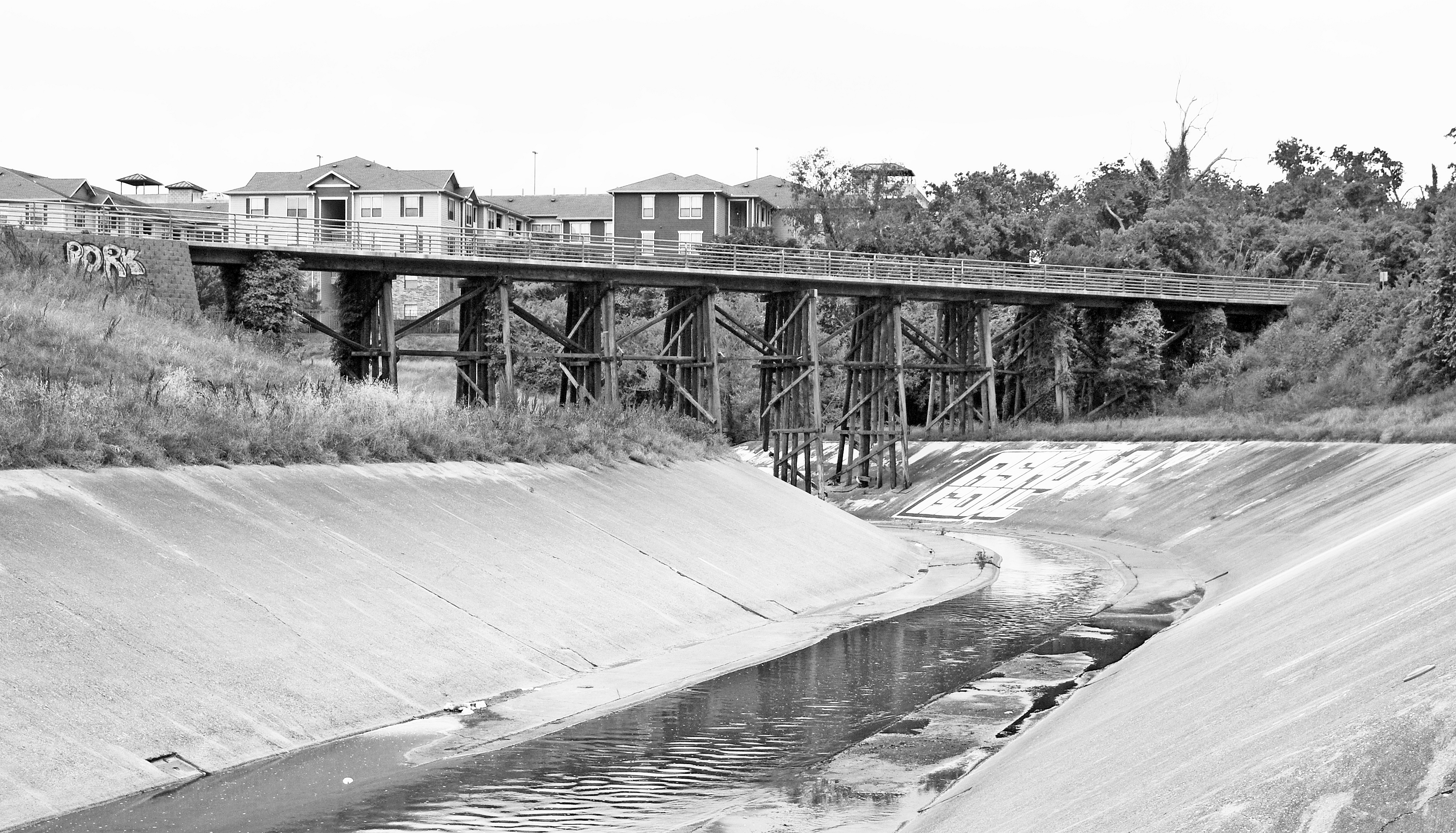
This former Missouri–Kansas–Texas Railroad bridge over the White Oak Bayou in Houston is now part of the Heights Bike Trail

Connections to and from the West White Oak Bayou Trail include the Central Business District (CBD) Access On-street Bikeway, at 11th Street and at Ella Boulevard on the south; and the West Houston On-street Bikeway, at 34th Street, Du Barry Lane (to Wakefield Drive), 43rd Street, Carleen Road (to Bethlehem Street), and Pinemont Drive on the north.

Just north of downtown Houston, around White Oak Park, the banks of White Oak Bayou have been cleaned and a swampy area restored where birdwatching can be enjoyed. Yellow-crowned night heron and green heron nest there, and a number of eastern woodland birds also reside in and around the park. In addition, the White Oak Bayou Association, a non-profit organization dedicated to the preservation, restoration, and maintenance of wildlife habitats along the bayou, has been established as part of the Citizens' Environmental Coalition.

Also along the bayou, between 18th and 11th Streets, is a grove of trees that have been planted by Trees For Houston. The "Tribute Grove" offers individuals the opportunity to commemorate special people or events by planting a tree on White Oak's banks. Since 1997, 1,494 trees have been planted in area Tribute Groves by Trees For Houston.

== See also ==
- List of rivers of Texas
