= Texas Shuffle =

Studio album by Rocky Hill
- Released: 1982
- Recorded: 1982
- Genre: Blues rock
- Length: 38:34
- Label: Tomato
- Producer: Rocky Hill, Kevin Eggers

Texas Shuffle is an album by blues guitarist Rocky Hill. The album features Johnny Winter and Dr. John.

== Track listing ==
| No. | Title | Writer(s) | Length |
|---|---|---|---|
| 1. | "Rock n' Roll" | | 0:49 |
| 2. | "Hootchie Cootchie Man" | Willie Dixon | 5:39 |
| 3. | "Future Blues" | Willie Brown | 2:55 |
| 4. | "Fool for You" | Ray Charles | 4:17 |
| 5. | "Bad Girl Blues" | Memphis Willie B. | 2:48 |
| 6. | "Blood Stream" | Rocky Hill, Townes Van Zandt | 2:30 |
| 7. | "My Guitar" | | 3:24 |
| 8. | "Gimmie the Gun" | | 2:59 |
| 9. | "Young Man" | Mose Allison | 3:24 |
| 10. | "Yes Indeed" | Sy Oliver | 2:26 |
| 11. | "Preaching Blues" | Robert Johnson | 2:10 |
| 12. | "Red Rooster Jam" | Willie Dixon | 5:13 |
| Total length: | | | 38:34 |
