= Main Street Market Square Historic District =

Historic district in Houston, Texas, U.S.

Coordinates: 29.762°N 95.362°W

- U.S. National Register of Historic Places
- U.S. Historic district
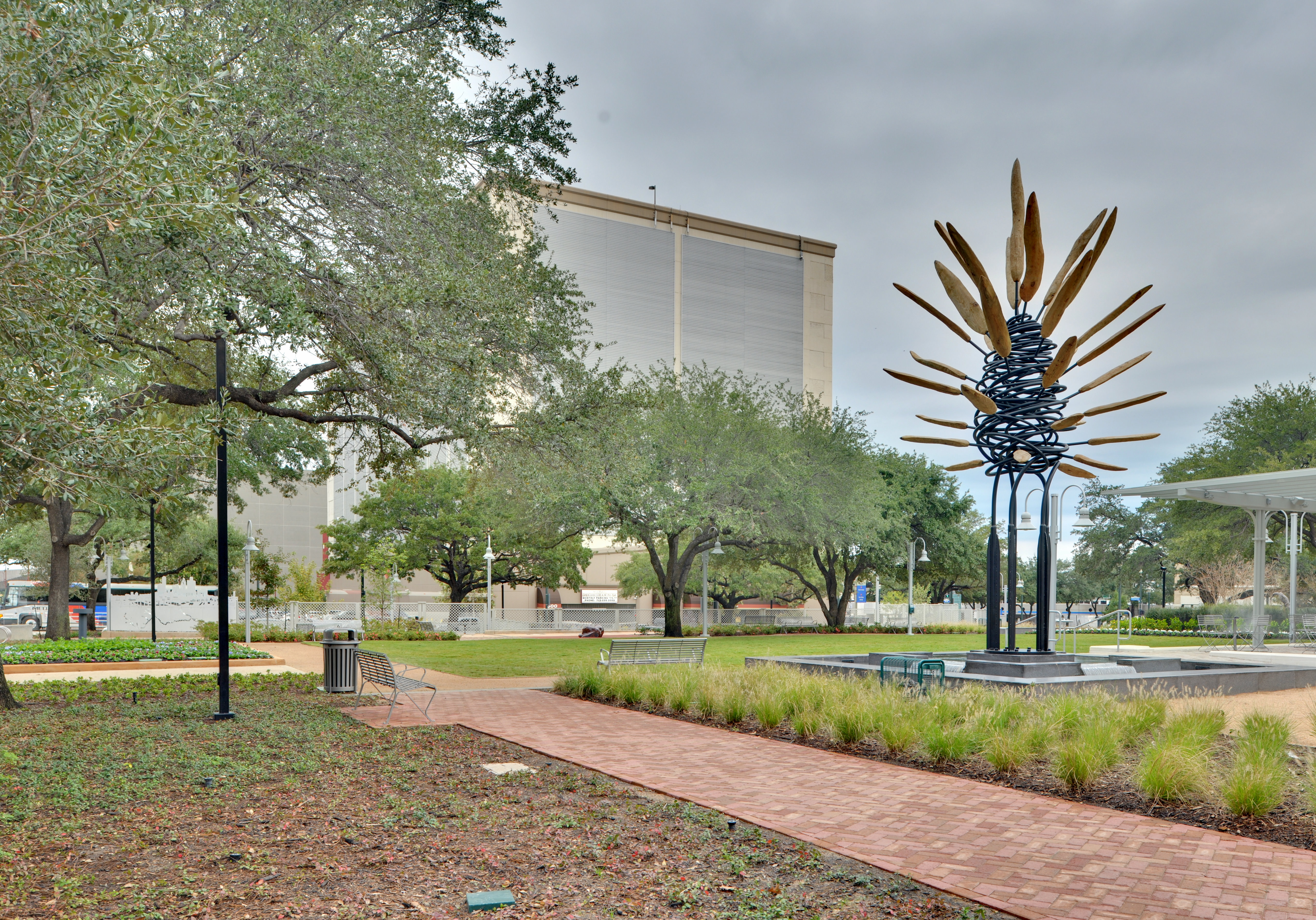

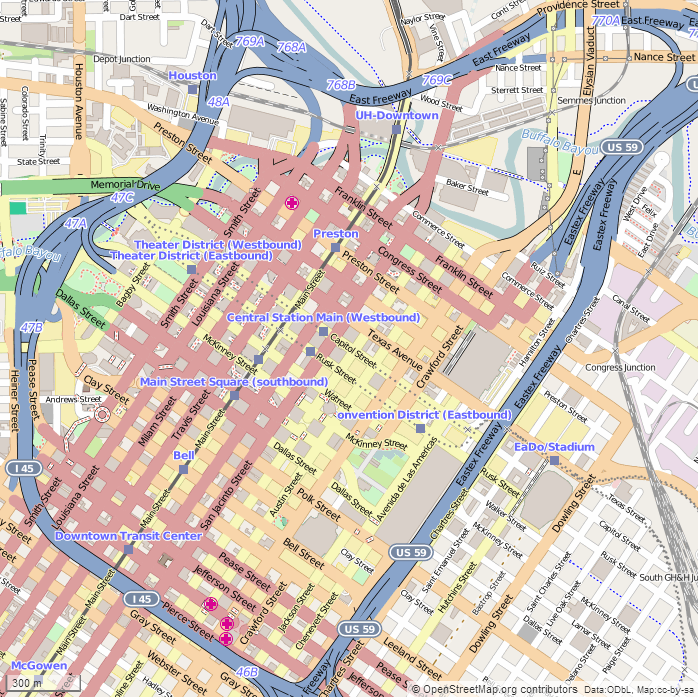
- Location within Houston Downtown Location within Texas Location within the United States
- Location: Roughly bounded by Buffalo Bayou, Fannin, Texas, and Milam streets Houston, Texas
- Built: 1858
- Architect: Multiple
- Architectural style: various
- NRHP reference No.: 83004471
- Added to NRHP: July 18, 1983

Main Street Market Square Historic District is a historic district in Houston, Texas that includes the Market Square Park. It includes buildings nearby, as well as the square itself. It was listed on the National Register of Historic Places in 1983.

== Description ==
=== Boundaries ===
The Main Street Market Square District has irregular boundaries. The district includes all of the blocks between Travis and Main from Texas Street to the northern boundary of University of Houston-Downtown. From the southern edge of Market Square at Preston Street, it captures all of the blocks northward until Buffalo Bayou. It includes three and a half blocks between Main and Fannin Streets, running south from Franklin Street. A wedge-shaped, partial block at Milam falls within the district, as well as a partial block east of Main Street at the base of the viaduct.

=== Features ===
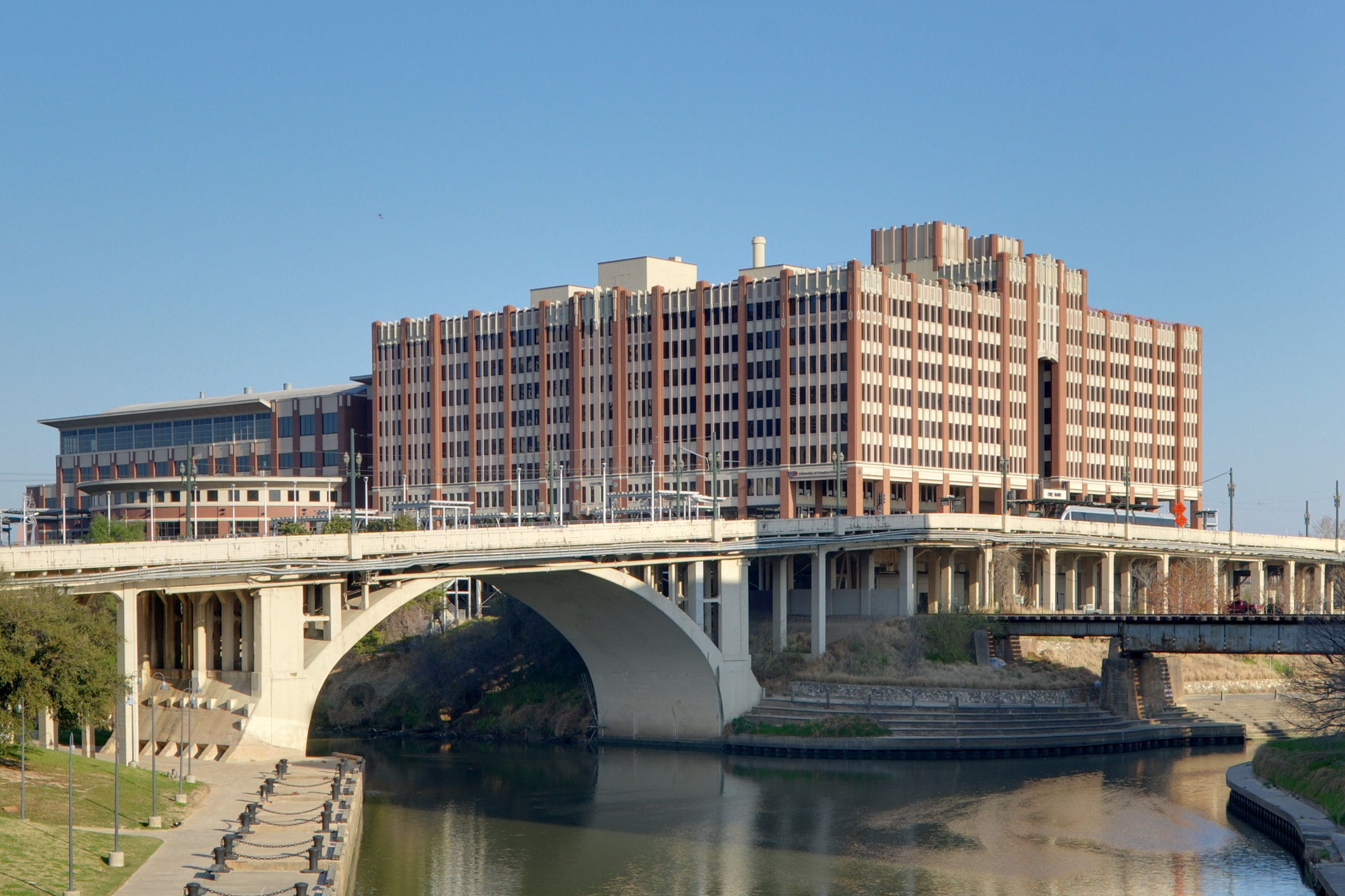
One Main Building (formerly the Merchants and Manufacturers Building), located on the campus of the University of Houston–Downtown

The University of Houston–Downtown (UHD) is a four-year state university, located within the Main Street Market Square Historic District. Founded in 1974, it is one of four separate and distinct institutions in the University of Houston System. UHD has an enrollment of 12,900 students—making it the 13th largest public university in Texas and the second-largest university in the Houston area.

One of the anchors of the district is Market Square Park, so-named because this site previously hosted four Houston City Halls and City Markets. Adjacent to the park are three nineteenth-century structures: the Fox-Kuhlman Building at 305-307 Travis, the Baker-Meyer Building at 315 Travis, and the Kennedy Bakery Building at 813 Congress. Like the Kennedy Bakery Building, the property at 214 Travis had been owned by Irish-born baker, John Kennedy. He started a building there in 1860. WL Foley Dry Goods commissioned Eugene Heiner to enlarge the structure in 1889. Across the street at 201 Travis is the Houston National Bank, once owned by Ross S. Sterling. Houston Ice and Brewing Company built the Magnolia Brewery Building at 110 Milam and the Magnolia Ballroom an adjacent facility at 715 Franklin.

Eugene Heiner designed two other buildings in the district: the 1882 Henry Brashear Building at 910 Prairie, and the Sweeney and Coombs Building at 310 Main. Other historic buildings in the district along Main Street include the Rice Hotel, the Barringer-Norton Building, the Scanlan Building (Houston), the adjacent Stuart and Sterne Buildings, the Sweeney, Coombs, and Fredericks Building, and the Union National Bank Building.

== Gallery ==
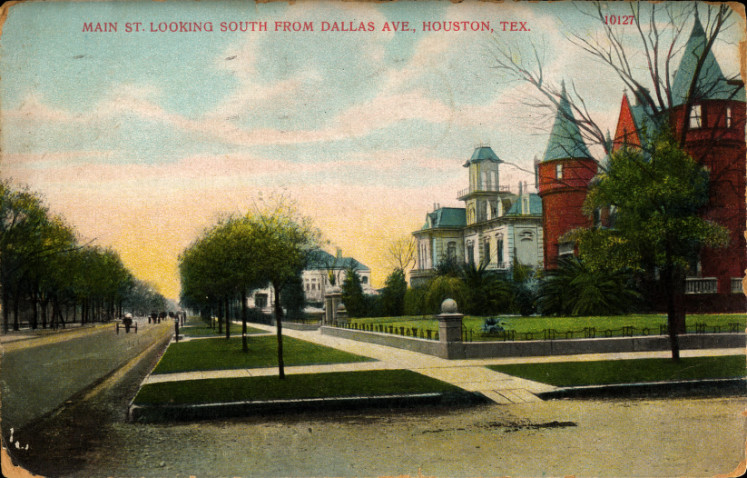
Main Street looking south from Dallas Avenue, Houston, Texas (postcard, circa 1909)

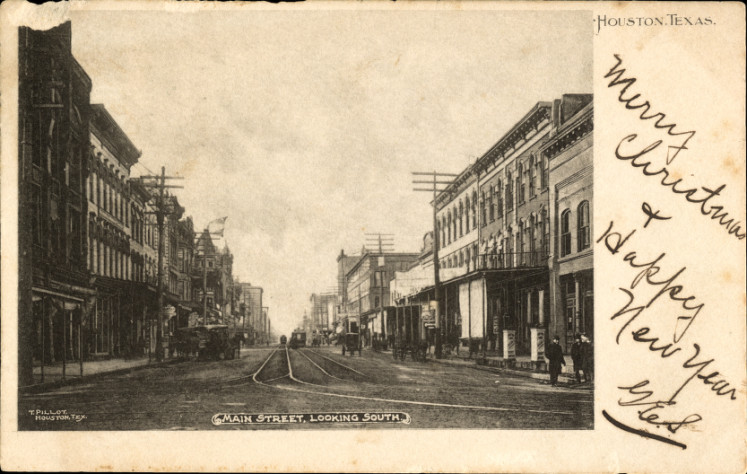
Main Street looking south Houston, Texas (postcard, circa 1904)

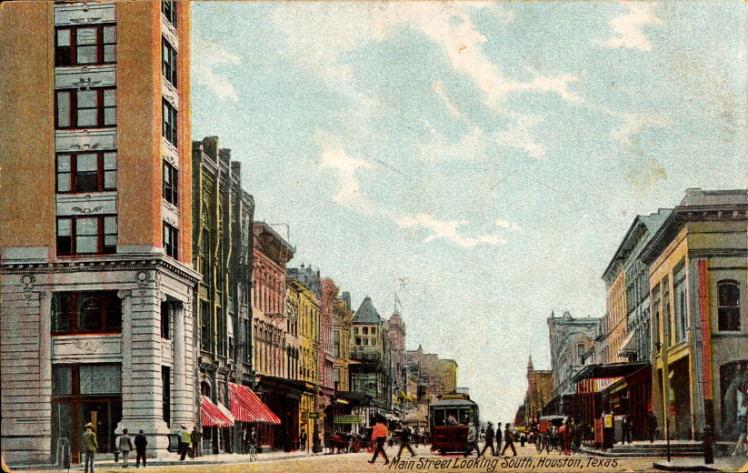
Main Street looking south, Houston, Texas (postcard, circa 1908)

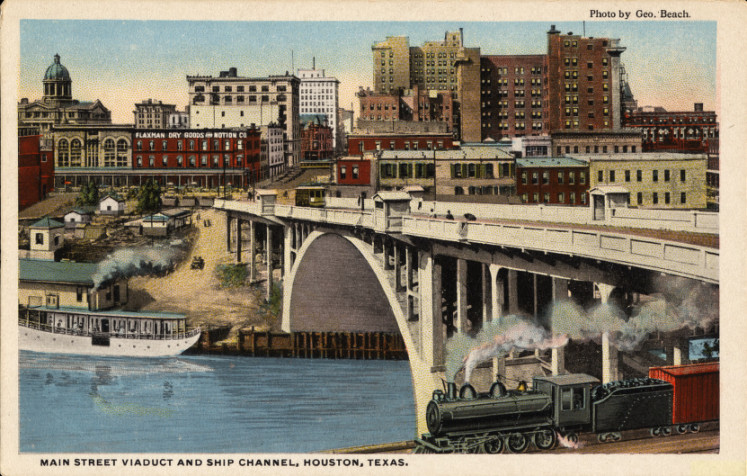
Main Street Viaduct and Ship Channel (postcard, circa 1913)

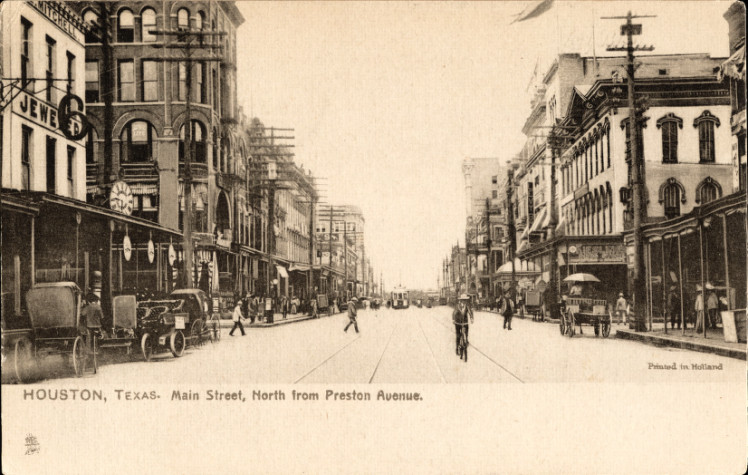
Main Street, north from Preston Avenue, Houston (postcard, circa 1905-1907)

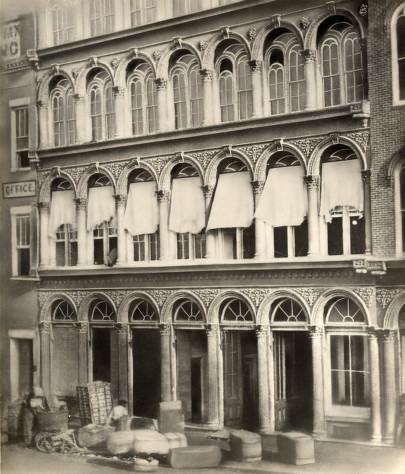
Morris building which was located on Main Street on the east side of the 300 block, c. 1869

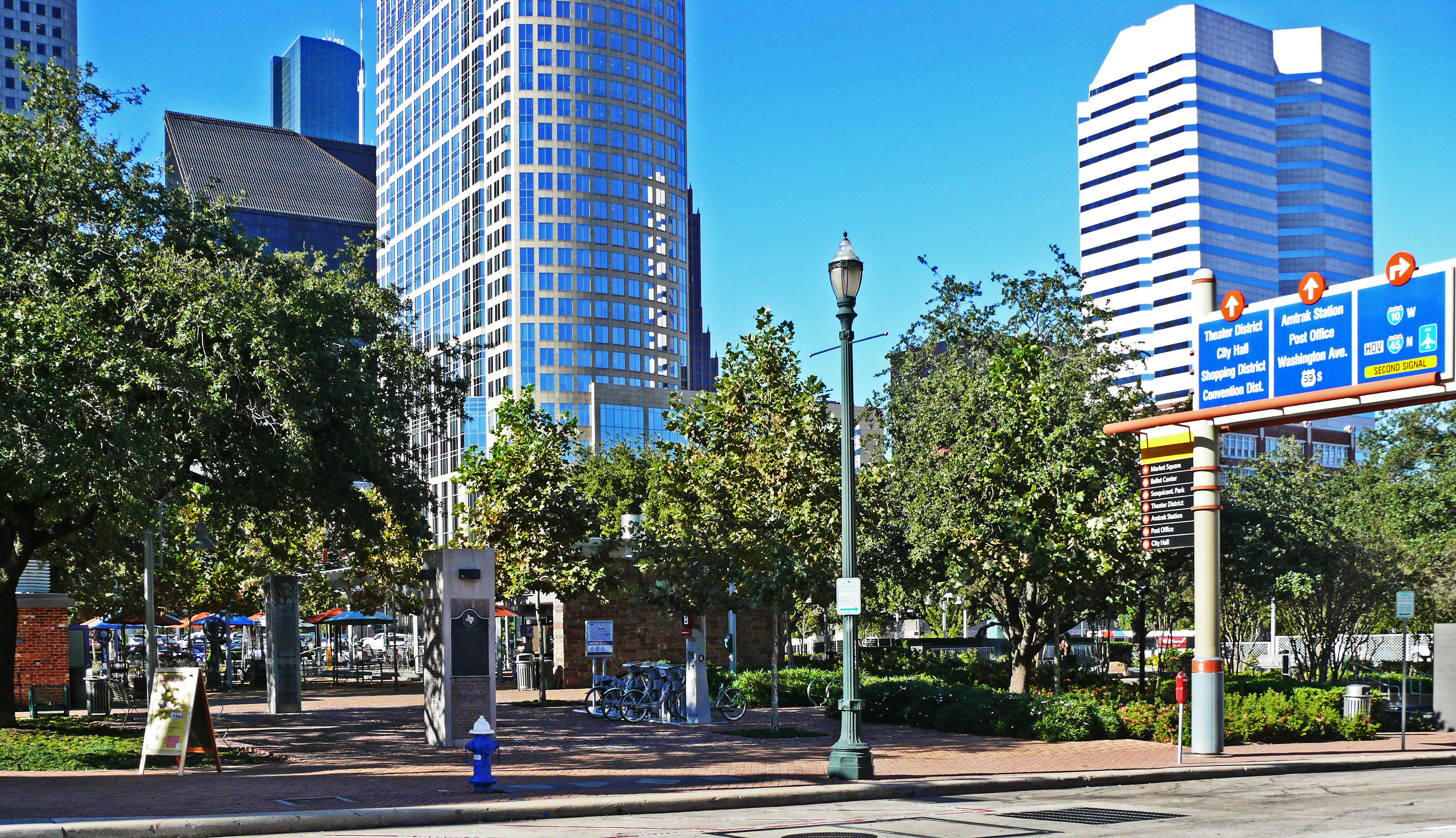
Market Square Park, SW corner of Congress @ Travis, 2012

== See also ==
- National Register of Historic Places listings in Harris County, Texas
