= James Surls =

American sculptor

- Born: James Arthur Surls; April 19, 1943 (age 83); Terrell, Texas, US
- Education: Sam Houston State University, Cranbrook Academy of Art
- Known for: sculptures
- Spouse(s): Martha Ann Gebhart, Linda Samuels, Charmaine Locke
- Website: https://jamessurls.com/

James Surls, Me, Knife, Diamond and Flower, pine, poplar and steel, 1999, El Paso Museum of Art

James Arthur Surls (born April 19, 1943) is an American modernist artist and educator, known for his large sculptures. He founded the Lawndale Alternative Arts Space at the University of Houston in the 1970s.

== Biography ==
James Arthur Surls was born April 19, 1943, in Terrell, Texas. His father Joe William Surls was a carpenter and a cattle breeder. His mother Martha Lucille Surls (née Ramsey) had been made an honorary Cherokee Nation elder as one of "The Wisdom Givers". He was raised in Malakoff, Texas, and spend much of his childhood helping his dad with chopping wood and building wooden structures. Surls attended Malakoff High School. After high school he attended Henderson County Junior College and transferred to a junior college in San Diego. While in San Diego he received notification of the military draft and had to return to Texas to file for deferment.

Surls earned a BS degree in 1966 from Sam Houston State University. He continued his studies and received a MFA degree in 1968 from the Cranbrook Academy of Art, where he studied sculpture under Julius Schmidt.

His sculpture Tornado was included in the 1979 Whitney Biennial. His sculptures Woods Angel and Man Doing War were included in the 1985 Whitney Biennial.

He taught art at Southern Methodist University, and University of Houston. Students of Surls included artists Mary Jenewein, Bernard Brunon, Peter McClennan, Robert Graham, Mark Diamond, Robert McCoy, Chris Huestis, Diane Falkenhagen, Donald Woodman, and others.

He is best known for large sculptures that are roughly hewn and derive much of their power from a close connection to nature and raw materials. His drawings and prints are largely monotone. Surls' work is particularly organic and primal. Having built a career in the 1980s and 1990s as a Texas artist, Surls relocated to a Colorado ranch and removed his work from for-profit galleries.

In 2009, five Surls bronze-and-steel bouquets were set up on Park Avenue by the New York City Parks Public Art Program and the fund for Park Avenue.

Surls has his work in various public museum collections including the Albright-Knox Art Gallery, the Cranbrook Art Museum, Dallas Museum of Art, Museum of Fine Arts, Houston, Smithsonian American Art Museum, Cleveland Museum of Art, Memphis Brooks Museum of Art, Modern Art Museum of Fort Worth, Fred Jones Jr. Museum of Art at the University of Oklahoma, Meadows Museum at Southern Methodist University, among many others.

== Personal life ==
Surls has three daughters from his first marriage to Martha Ann Gebhart from 1965 to 1972. His second marriage was to Linda Samuels, she was from New England and they had met at Cranbrook Academy of Art. His third marriage was in 1978 to Charmaine Locke in Liberty, Texas, she was a former student of his at Southern Methodist University.

In 1997, he moved from Splendora, Texas, to Carbondale, Colorado.

== See also ==
- Points of View (Surls), (1991), outdoor sculpture, Houston, Texas
