= George E. Dickey =

American architect

- Born: October 29, 1840. Wilmot, New Hampshire.
- Died: 1900
- Occupation: Architect
- Spouse: Mary Messer of New London. Maria Watier. Georgia Dickey.
- Parent(s): James and Sebra Dickey.

George E. Dickey (1840–1900) was an architect who worked in the United States and Canada in the late 1800s.

== Early life ==
George E. Dickey was born in Wilmot, New Hampshire, on October 29, 1840, to James and Sebra Sickey. He grew up and attended school in New Hampshire.

== Career ==
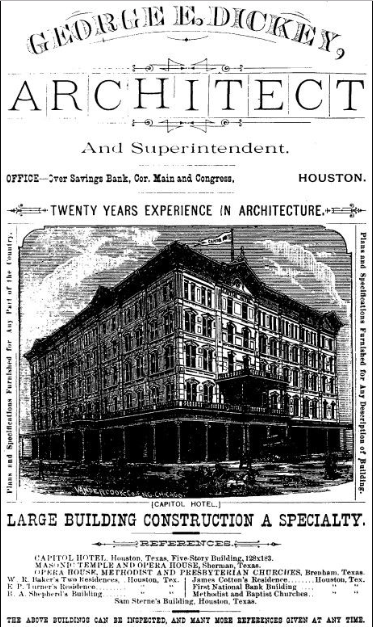
Advertisement for George E. Dickey, featuring a lithograph of the second Capitol Hotel building

Dickey went to Boston for professional training. He practiced architecture in Waltham, Massachusetts, and Manchester, New Hampshire, before moving to Toronto in 1873. After five years he moved to Houston.

Dickey designed many commercial and residential buildings during his career in Houston. His design of the B.A. Shepherd Building (1883) at 219 Main is an example of High Victorian Gothic according to architectural historian, Barrie Scardino Bradley. This building was at first home to the First National Bank of Houston, and was occupied by the Houston National Bank starting in 1886. This building was demolished in 1989 to make room for a parking garage. Another important Dickey commission was the Capitol Hotel built in 1883. The Capitol Hotel was planned for the site of the former Capitol building at the corner of Main Street and Texas Avenue, but with a larger building footprint and with five stories. For the Capitol Hotel, Dickey employed Renaissance Revival features, and incorporated modern infrastructure, including indoor plumbing, gas lighting, and an elevator.

=== Houston City Hall ===
In November 1902 Dickey was awarded a contract to design Houston's fourth City Hall, the previous three all having been destroyed by fire. Dickey based his design, featuring two towers for a clock and bell, on the previous city halls, but Dickey designed the stone and brick building in a Victorian Romanesque style which was outdated. The building was completed in 1904. In 1939, the city government moved to a new building on Bagby Street, and the building was destroyed by fire in 1960.

== Personal life ==
Dickey wedded Mary Messer of New London, New Hampshire, in 1862. He married Maria Watier, a native of Montreal. His third wife was Georgia Dickey. From these three marriages, he had a total of eight children. His eldest son practiced architecture with him.

== Notable works ==
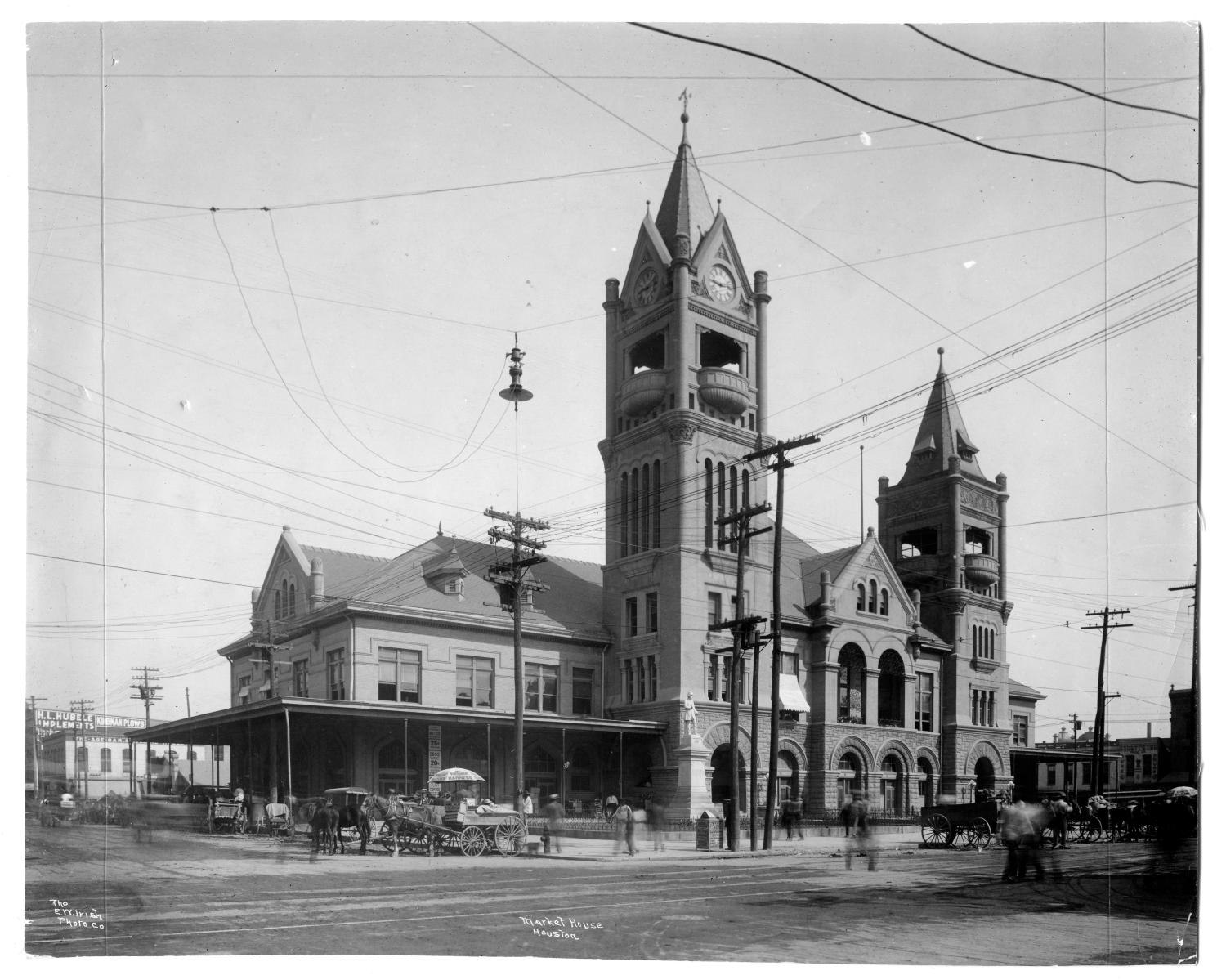
Houston City Hall and Market House (1904-1960)

- Grand Opera House, Brenham, Texas (1878)
- Masonic Temple and Opera House, Sherman, Texas (1880)
- (Second) Capitol Hotel, Houston (1883, demolished)
- Shearn Memorial Methodist Episcopal Church, Houston (1883, demolished)
- First Baptist Church, Houston (1884, demolished)
- Jedidiah Porter Waldo House, 1213 Rusk Avenue at the corner of San Jacinto Street, Houston (1884). Dismantled in 1903 and reassembled in 1905 at 201 Westmoreland Avenue, Houston.
- First Presbyterian Church, Houston (1885, demolished)
- S. K. Dick House, Houston (1885, demolished)
- T. W. House House, Houston (1885, demolished)
- Grand Central Depot, Houston (1889, demolished)
- Sweeney, Coombs, and Fredericks Building, Houston (1889)
- Houston Light Guard Armory (1891, demolished)
- St. Joseph Catholic Church, 1505 Kane Street, Houston (1902, assisting Patrick S. Rabitt).
- City Hall and Market House, Houston (1904, demolished 1960)

== Bibliography ==
- Bradley, Barrie Scardino (2020). Improbable Metropolis: Houston's Architectural and Urban History. Austin: University of Texas Press. ISBN 978-1-4773-2019-8.
- Houghton, Dorothy Knox Howe; Bradley, Barrie Scardino; Howe, Katherine S.; Blackburn, Sadie Gwin (1998). Houston's Forgotten Heritage: Landscapes, Houses, Interiors, 1824–1914. College Station, TX: Texas A&M University. ISBN 978-1-62349-246-5.
- Robinson, Willard B. (1981). Gone From Texas: Our Lost Architectural Heritage. Austin: University of Texas Press. ISBN 0-89096-106-9.
