= Allen's Landing =

Birthplace of the city of Houston, Texas

Coordinates: 29°45′55.6″N 95°21′30.5″W

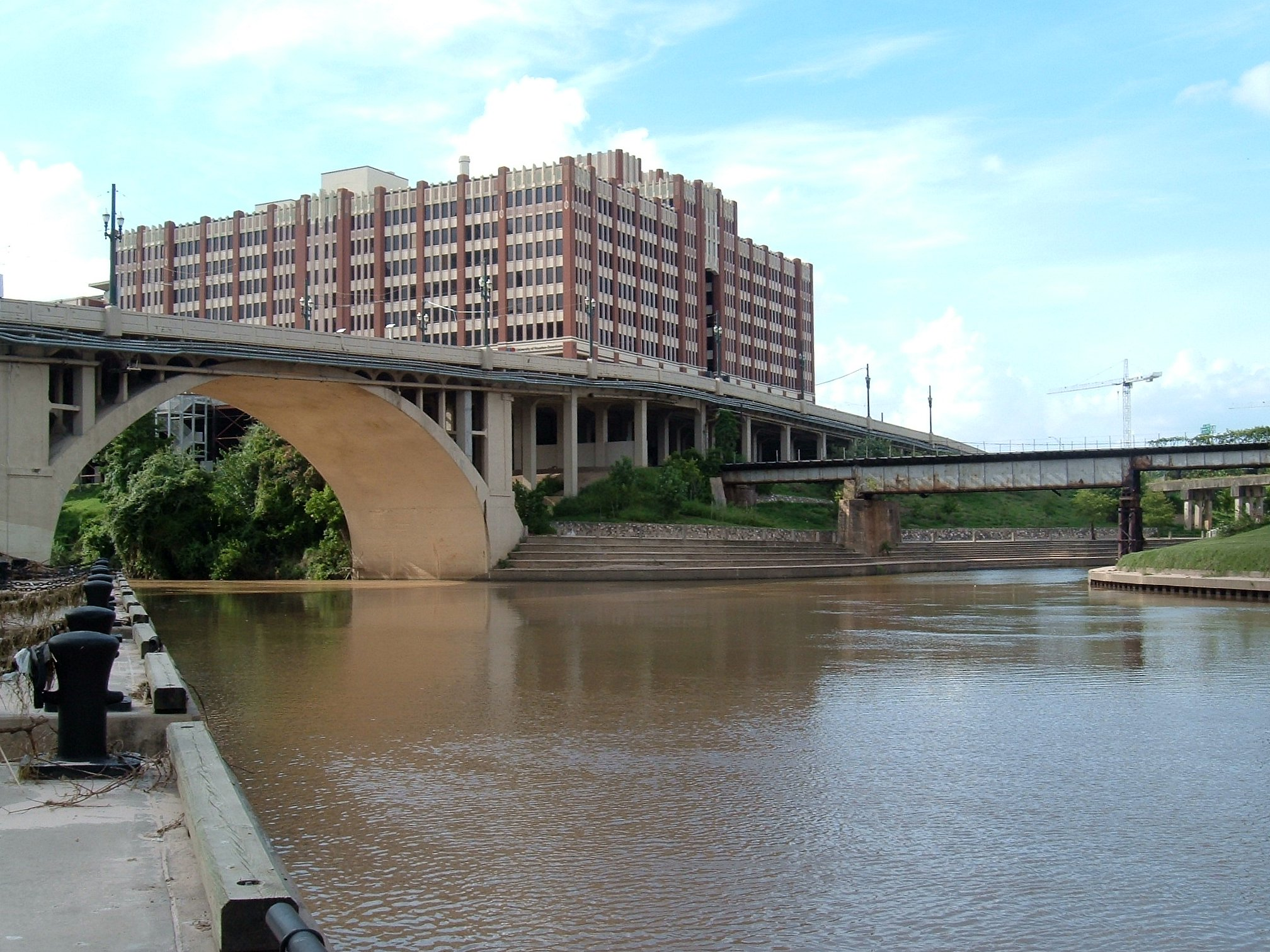
Allen's Landing

Allen's Landing is the officially recognized birthplace of the city of Houston, Texas, United States, the largest city in Texas and the fourth largest in the United States. Located in Downtown Houston between the Main Street and Fannin Street viaducts, the landing encompasses the southern bank of Buffalo Bayou, the city's principal river, at its confluence with White Oak Bayou, a major tributary. Allen's Landing is located south of the University of Houston–Downtown Commerce Street Building.

In August 1836, just months after the Republic of Texas won its independence from Mexico, two New York real estate developers, John Kirby Allen and Augustus Chapman Allen, purchased 6,642 acres (26.88 km^{2}) of coastal prairie and settled the town of Houston on the banks of Buffalo Bayou. The present-day landing area was advertised as the head of navigation of the bayou and served as the city's first wharf.

== History ==
Allen's Landing is at the confluence of White Oak Bayou and Buffalo Bayou and serves as a natural turning basin. A dock was quickly opened on the site, and the steamer Laura was the first ship to anchor at the landing on January 26, 1837. The landing was officially named a port in 1841—the original Port of Houston. In 1910, the United States government approved funding for the dredging of a ship channel from the Gulf of Mexico to the present turning basin four miles (6 km) to the east of Allen's Landing.

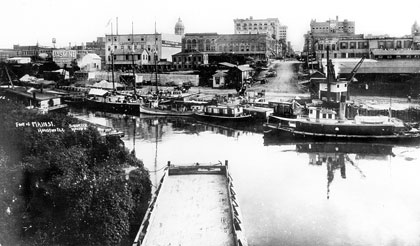
Allen's Landing, c. 1900

In the late 1960s, Allen's Landing was home to the city's premiere psychedelic nightclub, Love Street Light Circus Feel Good Machine ("Love Street"), where bands with names like Bubble Puppy, Neurotic Sheep and American Blues performed mind-expanding music accented with strobe lights and pastel projections. The historic Sunset Coffee Building on Commerce at Main Street, which housed the nightclub on its third floor, is still standing. Love Street's last show was on July 7, 1980.

Once the focal point of downtown Houston, a small historical park was dedicated at the site in 1967. The Southern Pacific Railroad donated 4,000 square feet (370 m^{2}) of land to the park project, which was to be developed and maintained by the Houston Chamber of Commerce, the City of Houston, and the Harris County Navigation District. In addition, a marker was placed at the park to indicate where, in 1837, townspeople erected a liberty pole to commemorate Sam Houston's victory over Santa Anna at the Battle of San Jacinto the previous year.

For a brief period in the 1990s, Allen's Landing was once again the docking site for the Laura, a sightseeing boat that was a namesake of the 19th century vessel.

The name Allen’s Landing is a 20th-century creation not found in any historical document. According to a 2008 Houston Chronicle article, the name was the invention of the Houston Chamber of Commerce. Charlie Lansden, longtime director of the chamber's Community Betterment Division, made this claim to Janet Wagner, a local historian. The name appears in a mural of Houston commissioned by the Houston Club in 1955 and painted by artist David Adickes.

== Revitalization ==
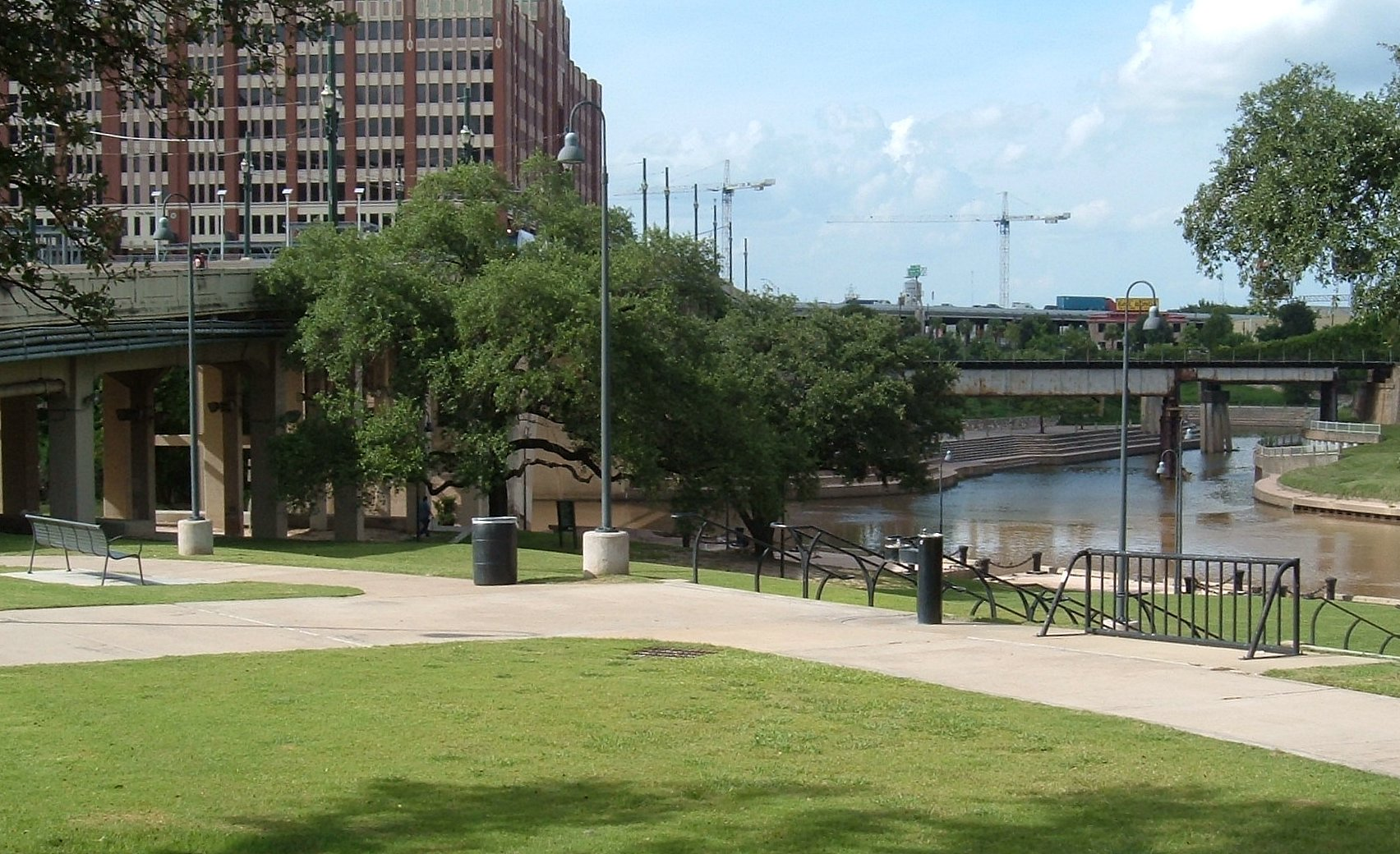
Allen's Landing Park

After years of neglect and deterioration, Allen’s Landing, as part of Houston's Waterfront District, has undergone major revitalization and rejuvenation, much like the rest of historic downtown Houston. The first phase of the Allen's Landing revitalization project was completed in 2001. Special features of the park, located at 1001 Commerce Street, now include: a concrete-paved wharf, designed to replicate the original port; a trail/walkway; a promenade; and a terrace overlooking Buffalo Bayou.

The campus of the University of Houston–Downtown (UHD) straddles Allen's Landing. The university's One Main Building, which is housed in the former Merchants and Manufacturers Building (renovated in the 1980s), is just across the bayou at One Main Street, and UHD's 95,000-square-foot (8,800 m^{2}) Commerce Street Building, which was completed in May 2005, sits adjacent to the park at Main Street and Commerce.

Since 2001, in a celebration of Houston's Asian American community, the Texas Dragon Boat Association has held an annual spring festival at Allen's Landing, where teams of paddlers race dragon boats throughout the day and enjoy colorful entertainment, as well as some Asian cultural and cuisine. In addition, the landing is a popular ingress/egress spot for canoe and kayak enthusiasts traveling up and down Buffalo Bayou.

In 2006, Houston Endowment, Inc., a philanthropic foundation dedicated to improving life for the people of the greater Houston area, approved a $600,000 grant to be used by the Buffalo Bayou Partnership toward restoring and converting the 1930s Sunset Coffee Building into usable space and further improving Allen's Landing Park.
