= Greater Katy =

Suburban West Houston region in Texas

Greater Katy Area is the term often used to refer to a suburban region on the west side of the Greater Houston metropolitan area roughly corresponding to the boundaries of the Katy Independent School District. Many people and businesses in this area have a Katy address, but are not part of the city of Katy. This area includes the suburbs that surround the Katy city limits west to Pederson road, roughly east to State Highway 6, north to FM 529, and south to FM 1093/ Westpark Tollway Parkway. While these boundaries are not exact, it gives a rough outline of what most people consider Greater Katy, and what the USPS designates as "Katy, Texas" by assigning that city to addresses within zip codes that fall in this region. Most of Greater Katy is to the east of the city of Katy toward Houston and includes surrounding suburban areas and unincorporated areas that are not in the Houston city limits. The region includes parts of Harris County, Fort Bend County, and Waller County much as the City of Katy does. Greater Katy is one of the fastest-growing portions of the Houston metropolitan area and the state of Texas as a whole.

== History ==
The City of Katy was formally incorporated in 1945, but was settled as Cane Island in 1872.

The City of Houston did limited purpose annexation in Greater Katy after the year 2000.

As of 2015 the population of the Katy area is larger than that of the city limits of Pittsburgh, Pennsylvania.

== Greater Katy versus the City of Katy ==
The City of Katy, Texas is a very small area surrounded by the Greater Katy area. The City itself has 27,741 residents as of the 2020 census (29,000 is the 2025 estimate), while the greater Katy area has an estimated 375,000 residents living within the Katy Independent School District boundaries as of 2024. Many people confuse Greater Katy with the City of Katy; however, there is no city representation or services provided to people outside of the actual city limits of Katy. Some of this area is actually within the extraterritorial jurisdiction of the City of Houston. The city of Katy cannot annex this area without express permission from the City of Houston. This has occurred on several occasions in regards to relatively small tracts of land. This came into play with development of the Katy Mills Mall, which sat mostly within the City of Katy but about half was in the Houston ETJ. The developer and city of Katy threatened to build just a parking lot on the Houston area, depriving Houston of any real property tax revenue. For 1 million dollars Katy bought the right to annex the area desired.

- Katy Visitor and Tourism Bureau. Under the umbrella of the Katy Area Chamber of Commerce to promote the modest yet growing convention and tourism sector of the Greater Katy economy.

== Economy ==
Several corporations and employers are headquartered in the Greater Katy area.

As of 2014, within the area, the Katy Independent School District (a school district), having about 8,000 employees, is the largest employer. BP America, with about 7,000 employees, is the second largest.

Igloo Products is headquartered west of Katy in unincorporated Waller County. Academy Sports and Outdoors has its corporate offices and product distribution center in unincorporated western Harris County.

In 2008 KBR announced that a new office facility would appear at the intersection of the Grand Parkway and Interstate 10 in unincorporated western Harris County, Texas, between Houston and Katy. The new complex would have been be in close proximity to the Energy Corridor area of Houston. KBR planned to continue to have a corporate presence in Downtown. In December KBR said that it would not continue with the plans due to a weakened economy. In 2015 the former KBR property was sold to a development company, and has now become a Costco.

The Katy Area Economic Development Council serves as the economic development organization for the area. Founded in 2003, the Katy Area Economic Development Council’s (Katy Area EDC) mission is to establish the Katy area as the premier location for families and businesses through planned economic growth and economic development. Since its inception, the Katy Area EDC has grown to over 210 members, has a budget of $900,000 and has assisted in the creation of over 16,200 jobs and more than $2.5 billion in capital investment. Katy Area EDC is a full-service private, non-profit, 501 (c) 6 economic development corporation.

== Government and infrastructure ==
Harris County Sheriff's Office patrols areas of unincorporated areas of Harris County.

Harris County Leadership Academy (formerly Delta Boot Camp), a juvenile correctional facility of the Harris County Juvenile Probation Department, is in Harris County, near Katy. It is located on a 14-acre (5.7 ha) plot of land in the northwestern portion of the county, in proximity to the Sharp Road and the Katy-Hockley Road Cutoff intersection. The juvenile boot camp, scheduled to open in November 1999, was originally scheduled to be located in proximity to Barker Cypress Road and south of Interstate 10. It had a price of $2 million, with most of the money coming from federal grants and $500,000 coming from taxpayers. It had survived a lawsuit filed by residents of the area surrounding its current northwest Harris location.

Harris Health System, formerly Harris County Hospital District (the county's hospital district), operates the Danny Jackson Health Center in the Bear Hunter Plaza in Greater Katy. Prior to Jackson's opening, the designated public health center was the Northwest Health Center in Houston. The nearest public hospital is Ben Taub General Hospital in the Texas Medical Center, Houston. Fort Bend County does not have a hospital district. OakBend Medical Center serves as the county's charity hospital which the county contracts with.

== Demographics ==
By 2004 many Venezuelans fleeing the economic changes by the Hugo Chávez government settled in the Houston area due to the oil industry, and they specifically chose to move to the Katy area due to the Katy Independent School District's reputation and the proximity to their workplaces in west Houston. As a result, the Katy area received the nickname "Katyzuela". By 2016 real estate agents began using the "Katyzuela" moniker. In regards to the nickname, Sebastian Herrera of the Houston Chronicle wrote "no one seems quite sure who to credit." As of 2017 almost 50% of the people of Venezuelan origins in Greater Houston lived in Greater Katy, meaning almost 5,050 people of Venezuelan origins lived in Greater Katy. Katy, Texas has among the largest Venezuelan American populations outside Florida.

In particular, as of 2012 Venezuelans are concentrated in Cinco Ranch. As of 2015 two restaurants, Budare Arepa Express and Delis Café, according to Florian Martin of Houston Public Media, "could be considered the social centers of the Venezuelan community in Katy. " By 2023, multiple Venezuelan restaurants were established in the Katy area. St. Faustina Catholic Church has a Spanish worship service that attracts Venezuelan people. Naida Givvon established a Venezuelan cultural festival in 2011; it is held every year at the Southwest Equestrian Center.

Prior to the growth of the Venezuelan community, circa the 1990s, the main Hispanic and Latino population in Greater Katy was Mexican American.

The Asian American population of Greater Katy was about 40,000 in 2019, and from 2000 to 2010 that population increased 300%. There is a development called Katy Asian Town, which is 1.5 acres (0.61 ha) large. The development is in the Houston limited purpose annexation area.

== Education ==
=== Primary and secondary schools ===
==== Public schools ====
The Katy Independent School District operates public schools in much of Greater Katy. Schools listed are in Greater Katy only.

Public high schools:

- Cinco Ranch High School
- Katy High School
- Mayde Creek High School
- Morton Ranch High School
- Seven Lakes High School
- James E. Taylor High School
- Obra D. Tompkins High School
- Patricia E. Paetow High School
- Jordan High School
- Freeman High School

Thornton Middle School of the Cypress-Fairbanks Independent School District has a Katy postal address.

Aristoi Classical Academy (formerly West Houston Charter School), a state charter school, is in the City of Katy.

==== Private schools ====
- Berean Christian Academy (formerly Faith West Academy, merged with the pre-merger Berean Christian in 2026) - Harris County
- Saint John XXIII High School - Harris County - Opened in 2004
- British International School of Houston (BISH) - Harris County
  - The current Greater Katy campus in September 2016. The school selected the Katy area partly because many BISH students reside in Greater Katy.
- Epiphany of the Lord Catholic School - Harris County - K-8 school
  - Sponsored by Epiphany of the Lord Church, this is the first Catholic grade school in Greater Katy. The 74,000-square-foot (6,900 m^{2}) campus, a part of the church property, included 26,000 square feet (2,400 m^{2}) of existing church property and 48,000 square feet (4,500 m^{2}) of new footage. Its two-story school building, with each grade level having three classrooms, had a cost of $12 million. The campus has a playground, a library, a cafeteria, and a music room. The proposed yearly tuition was $8,000. The school administration used a $5 million capital campaign to raise funds for the construction. Construction began in June 2017. The school began accepting applications in March 2018 and planned to open in fall 2018.

Prior to the opening of Epiphany of the Lord, the closest area Catholic grade school was John Paul II Catholic School in the Energy Corridor area in Houston.

The pre-merger Berean Christian, in the City of Katy, started operations in 2016 and merged with Faith West in 2026, consolidating in the Faith West location in Harris County.

As of 2019 The Village School in the Energy Corridor area has two bus services to Greater Katy, with one to Cinco Ranch. In addition the Awty International School in Spring Branch, which has one of the Houston area's French international schools, maintains a bus service to Greater Katy.

=== Higher education ===
Katy ISD is in the service area of the Houston City College System. HCC Northwest College operates the Katy Campus.

Additionally, areas in Waller County are in the service area for Blinn College.

Cy-Fair ISD areas are in the service area of Lone Star College.

=== Public libraries ===
Harris County Public Library operates the Katy Library in the City of Katy.

Greater Katy is served by the Fort Bend County Libraries Cinco Ranch Branch Library is in Cinco Ranch, south of Katy. The HCPL Maud Smith Marks Branch Library is in unincorporated Harris County, east of Katy.

== Key roads and streets within Greater Katy ==
=== North-South roads ===
(listed from west to east)

- Pederson Road
- Cane Island Parkway
- FM 1463
- Pin Oak Road
- Spring Green Boulevard
- Gaston Road
- Katy-Fort Bend County Road
- Grand Parkway (State Highway 99)
- Peek Road
- Mason Road
- Westgreen Boulevard
- Fry Road (Also an East/West road)
- Greenhouse Road
- Barker-Cypress Road
- Queenston Boulevard
- State Highway 6

=== East-West roads ===
(listed from north to south)

- FM 529
- West Little York Road
- Kieth Harrow Boulevard
- Clay Road
- Morton (Ranch) Road
- Franz Road/Saums Road
- Colonial Parkway/Park Row
- Katy Freeway (Interstate 10)
- Kingsland Boulevard
- Highland Knolls Drive/Bay Hill Boulevard
- Rosener Road
- Falcon Landing Boulevard
- Cinco Ranch Boulevard
- Westheimer Parkway
- Fry Road (Also a North/South road)
- FM 1093/Westpark Tollway

== Neighborhoods within Greater Katy ==
Greater Katy is, for the most part, subdivisions and master planned communities with retail centers. Some of the neighborhoods and subdivisions that are in Greater Katy:

- Cane Island—The first master-planned community built within the city limits of Katy, located north of Hwy 90, on the east edge of Katy, is the first development by Rise Communities of Nevada. The first residents moved into their homes during the 4th quarter of 2015, and once completely built out, the community will feature nearly 1100 acres with home sites ranging in size from 50 ft-100 ft lots. Builders include Cal-Atlantic Homes (Ryland) (50s, 60s), David Weekly Homes (50s, 55s, 65s), Perry Homes (60s, 80s), Coventry Homes (55s), Trendmaker Homes (80s), Shea Home (70s), and Toll Brother Builders (100s).
- Cimarron—Also an older neighborhood in the core area of Greater Katy, similar to West Memorial.
- Cinco Ranch—This is a collection of developments that was planned during the late 1980s, commenced building in the late 1990s, and is still growing. Second only to the Woodlands in growth. Cinco Ranch was the first of the ’ultra modern’ master planned developments to be built in Greater Katy. Typical subdivisions include swimming pools, parks, numerous lakes and man-made beaches. Housing prices range from the 170's to multimillion-dollar homes. Today, many of the new shopping outlets in Greater Katy are located in Cinco Ranch and the general vicinity.
- Falcon Point—A neighborhood built around The Club at Falcon Point, an 18-hole private golf club. Bay Hill Blvd comes to an end right in the middle of Falcon Point which is bordered by Roesner Rd and backs up to the Katy Mills Mall area.
- Firethorne—- A master-planned community built near just outside Katy city limits. It is a sprawling 1,500 acres (6.1 km^{2}) and homes just started construction in early 2008.
- Grand Lakes—A rather new neighborhood built between Cinco Ranch and the Westpark Tollway. The community does have a series of lakes. In May 2008, the last house in Grand Lakes was finished and the community is considered finished.
- Memorial Parkway—Neighborhood to the south and east of West Memorial. Both developments flank Mason Road. Memorial Parkway was built in the late 1970s and 1980.
- Nottingham Country—Built in the 1970s and 1980s as an upscale development with large brick homes and an oversized community center and swimming pool.
- Seven Meadows—A smaller community located south of I-10 between Fry Road and FM 1093. It is very close to the Westpark Tollway allowing a quick commute to Houston. Avalon at Seven Meadows features lakefront custom and semi-custom homes as well as patio golf course homes.
- West Memorial—The oldest development outside the City of Katy, now located in the center of the Greater Katy area. Most of the homes here were built in the late 1960s and early 1970s and the area has indeed matured out with large trees lining the streets and homes there. Generally considered an older middle-class neighborhood.
- Williamsburg—This was supposed to be a master-planned community. Built in the late 70's/early 80's, and really didn't take off, some say, because it is located north of I-10. Its neighborhoods includes: Williamsburg Settlement, Williamsburg Parish, Williamschase, Williamsburg Hamlet, and Williamsburg Colony.

== Culture ==
In 2013 the Katy Youth Cricket, the first children's cricket club in the Houston area, was established.

By 2019 there was an increase in non-chain restaurants that covered different kinds of cuisines.

Beginning in 2011, the Katy Equestrian Center began having the "Viva Venezuela" festival, with 12,000 to 15,000 people going each year.

== Religion ==
As of 2016 there are Christian, Jewish, Muslim, and Hindu institutions in Greater Katy and nearby; there are Christian churches in the original City of Katy and in unincorporated areas, while religious buildings of other faiths are located in unincorporated areas but not in the original city.

=== Christianity ===
The original City of Katy became known as the "City of Churches" due to the role of religion in daily life. As of 2016 the city had about 15 churches. The first church established in the city was First Baptist Church, and other churches in the city include St. Bartholomew the Apostle Catholic Church, Katy First United Methodist Church, Alief Baptist Church, and Parkway Fellowship Church.

In addition, several churches have been established in unincorporated areas in nearby Greater Katy. Epiphany of the Lord Catholic Church, in unincorporated Harris County, opened in 1981. In 1984 a Molotov cocktail damaged the church building. The church building received several additions. Jack Dinkins was the pastor in 2010. As of 2018 Tom Lam is the pastor of Epiphany of the Lord. St. Edith Stein Catholic Church, in unincorporated Harris County, on 20 acres (8.1 ha) of land adjacent to the Westfield subdivision, opened in September 1999. The Archdiocese of Galveston-Houston bought the site in March 1999. The church's 100-seat 15,000-square-foot (1,400 m^{2}) sanctuary and 20,000-square-foot (1,900 m^{2}) Formation Center were scheduled to be completed in early March 2004 for a total of $5.8 million. Other buildings were to be erected at a later time. Prior to the opening of the permanent facilities, the church was housed in Katy ISD buildings. In 2002 about 600 families were registered at St. Edith Stein. By 2006 the number of families was about 1,400. St. Faustina Catholic Church, in nearby Fulshear in Fort Bend County, is in proximity to Cinco Ranch and is popular with Greater Katy's Venezuelan population. The church has Spanish worship services, and occupies a 1,600-seat building on 24 acres (9.7 ha) of land in Cross Creek Ranch. St. Faustina was established in 2014 to relieve Epiphany of the Lord and St. Bartholomew as suburban growth had increased the number of area residents. Initially, masses were held in Joe Hubenak Elementary School, a Lamar Consolidated Independent School District facility. In 2017 it moved into its current building.

Greater Katy's first Catholic senior high school, Saint John XXIII High School, opened in 2004, and the first Catholic grade school, Epiphany of Our Lord Catholic School, was under development in 2016.

There is one pro-LGBTQ church on the west side of the Houston metropolitan area, First Christian Church (FCC) Katy.

=== Islam ===
Katy Islamic Center, the largest mosque in Greater Katy, is located in unincorporated Harris County. Operated by the Muslim American Society (MAS), it occupies an 11-acre (4.5 ha) tract with a 20,000-square-foot (1,900 m^{2}) mosque building that is two stories tall. In September 2006 the Katy Islamic Society purchased the tract for $1.1 million ($1756767.91 according to inflation). Around that time some neighbors of the tract reacted negatively. Many cited concerns involving infrastructure such as traffic and drainage. One man threatened to hold pig races, animals which are forbidden as a food in Islam. Another established a website that had a counter of terrorist attacks that occurred since the September 11 attacks. Construction began in 2008 after MAS acquired the tract, and it opened on June 13, 2015.

The Islamic Society of Greater Houston (ISGH) operates its own Katy-area mosque, Masjid Al-Aqsa (Katy Islamic Center or KIC), in unincorporated Fort Bend County.

=== Hinduism ===
Sai Durga Shiva Vishnu Temple is located in unincorporated Fort Bend County. In 2013 Sanatan Dharma Maha Sabha of Trinidad and Tobago, Branch 377, an organization of those who have Trinidad and Tobago ancestry, and the Hindu community of the Greater Katy area jointly began development of a new Hindu temple, which will include all Hindu deities rather than focusing on one deity. By November of that year, the 2.4-acre (0.97 ha) temple site already had its temporary buildings. The renovation was scheduled to begin in early 2014 with a goal of opening in May of that year. About 10-15 people are organizing the temple. Amaranth Venkateswarlu, an engineer who is one of the organizers, stated that there are about 500 Indian families who live in Greater Katy and that they went to Hindu temples in Pearland and Sugar Land.

=== Other ===
Congregation Or Ami is located in Westchase, in west Houston, in proximity to Greater Katy. As of 2018 the rabbi is Gideon Estes.

== Regional organizations ==
While the City of Katy is the only area served by the Katy municipal fire, police, and emergency services, there are other cases where all of Greater Katy is served by one organization. Examples include:

- Katy Independent School District. The Katy ISD serves the entire Greater Katy region as well as some parts of far west Houston. The KISD also extends into rural parts of the Cypress region.
- Katy Area Chamber of Commerce. This business promotion organization services the entire Katy region as well as parts of Houston's Energy Corridor. www.katychamber.com.
- Katy Economic Development Council. www.katyedc.org
