= Canyon Gate =

Subdivision in Texas, United States

Coordinates: 29.709983°N 95.738752°W

Canyon Gate at Cinco Ranch or Canyon Gate at Historic Cinco Ranch is a subdivision in unincorporated Fort Bend County, Texas, near the Cinco Ranch planned community. It is located at Farm to Market Road 1093 and Mason Road.

The development has 205 acres (83 ha) of land. As of 2018 it has 721 houses. Cinco Municipal Utility District (MUD) 8 provides utility services to the subdivision. James Drew of the Houston Chronicle described it as the "de facto government" of Canyon Gate. It was the first of several gated communities developed by Land Tejas Development.

== History ==
The initial developer was American General subsidiary Cinco Ranch East Development Inc. while Land Tejas Development LLC was another developer. Pulte Homes, Royce Homes, and Pine Forest Homes were the home builders.

In 1985 the Texas Legislature created Cinco MUD 8. The first houses were scheduled to be open in the beginning of 1998. The prices ranged from $90,000 to over $160,000. Many of the houses were built with "intelligent" computer systems from IBM.

The U.S. Army Corps of Engineers imposes flooding on the land on which Canyon Gate resides as part of the Army Corps' standard operating procedure for the Barker Dam and Reservoir. Beginning in 1994 the Fort Bend County government began including warnings about this aspect in government records; MUD 8 never included these warnings in its records. Canyon Gate was not defined as being in a 100-year floodplain so not very many residents obtained flood insurance.

In 1996 MUD 8 began selling bonds to pay off the developer's costs of creating the subdivision.

In August 2017 the U.S. Army Corps of Engineers flooded the subdivision during Hurricane Harvey as the Barker Reservoir filled to approximately 54% of its capacity.

== Government and infrastructure ==
As of 2018 Cinco MUD 8 board holds its meetings at Greenway Plaza in Houston.

== Education ==
Katy Independent School District operates area public schools:

- Sue Creech Elementary School
- Roger and Ellen Beck Junior High School
- Cinco Ranch High School

Previously Seven Lakes High School served the area.

University of Houston System - Cinco Ranch is in the area.
