= Cimarron, Texas =

Unincorporated community in Texas, US

Coordinates: 29°46′15″N 95°45′30″W

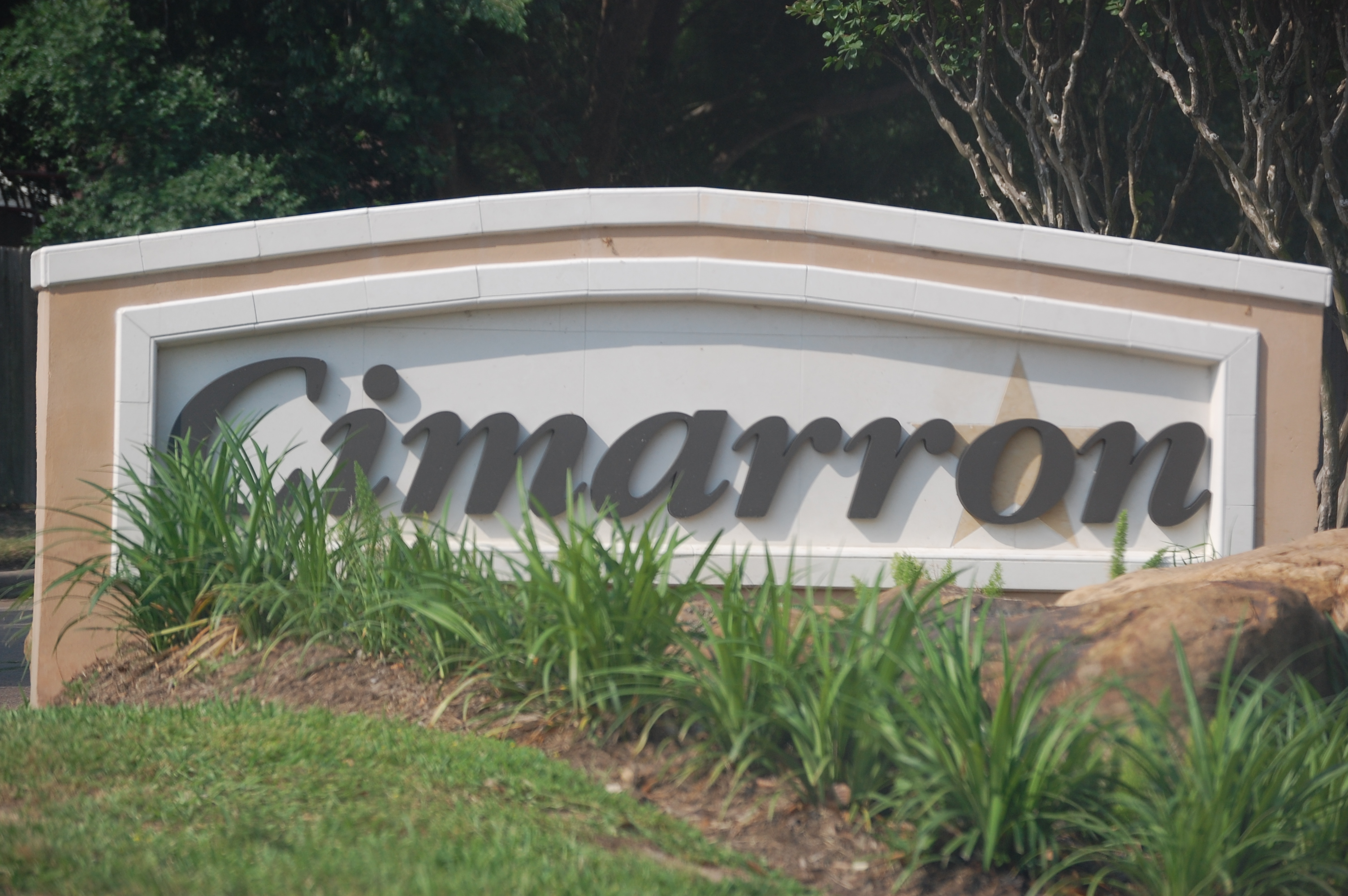
Sign at the entrance to Cimarron

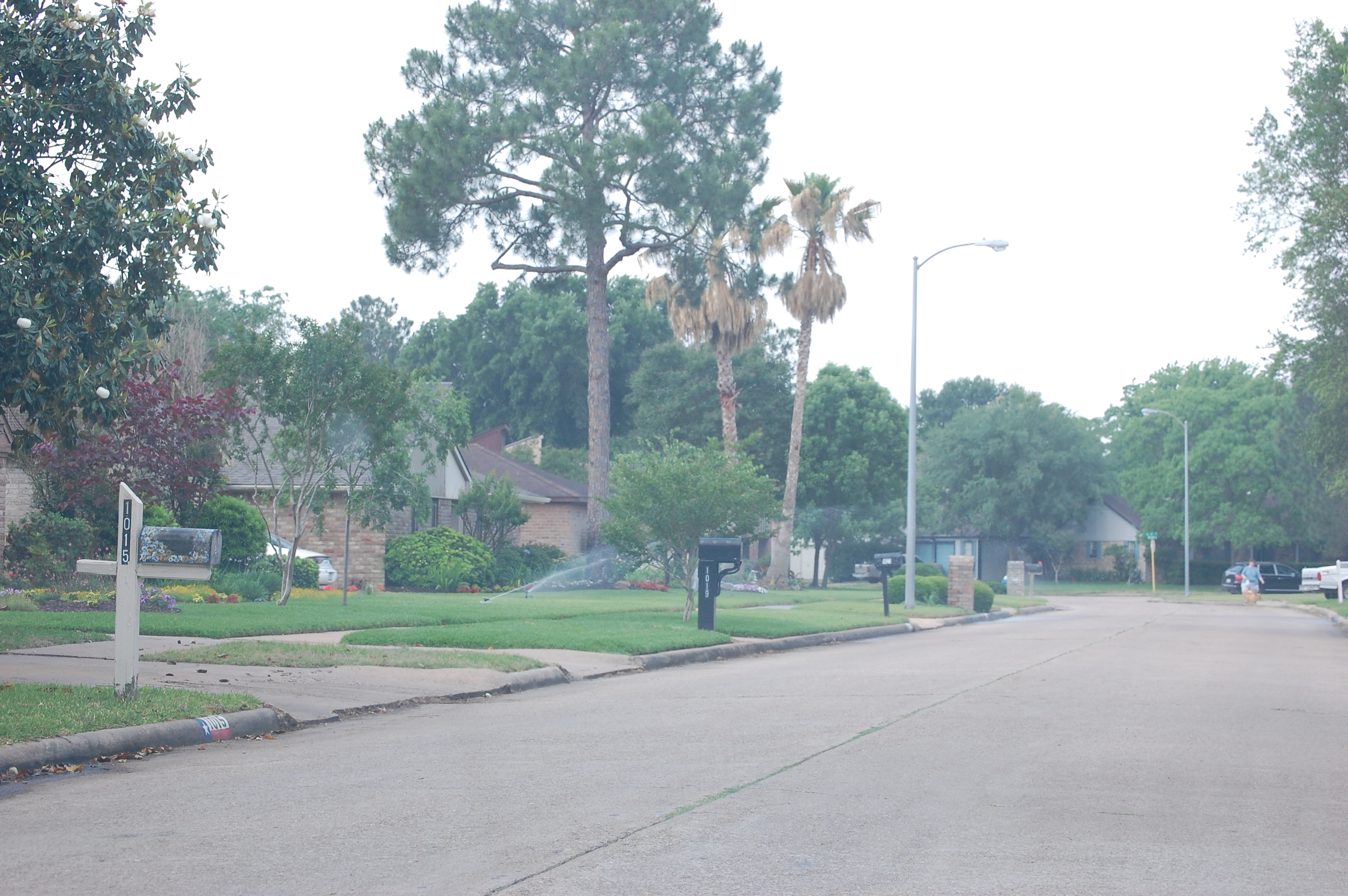
Street in Cimarron

Cimarron is an unincorporated community in Harris County, Texas, United States. It lies 40 km west of the heart of Houston, and six km southeast of Katy, at an elevation of 125 ft (38 m).

== History ==
Construction of the subdivision began in 1975, when the Homeowner association was incorporated, and the first house was constructed. The final house in the platted area was completed shortly after 1990.

Home values in the subdivision remained stable through the oil bust of the mid-1980s, and through the late-2000s recession. Local realtor Veronica Mullenix said of this tendency: “I think it’s pride of ownership more than anything else."

== Education ==
Cimarron is in the Katy Independent School District. Residents are zoned to Cimarron Elementary School, West Memorial Junior High School, and Cinco Ranch High School or James E. Taylor High School.

== Parks and recreation ==
The subdivision maintains a recreation complex for its residents, which includes a clubhouse, a playground, a swimming pool, and tennis courts.
