= James E. Taylor High School =

Public school in Texas, United States

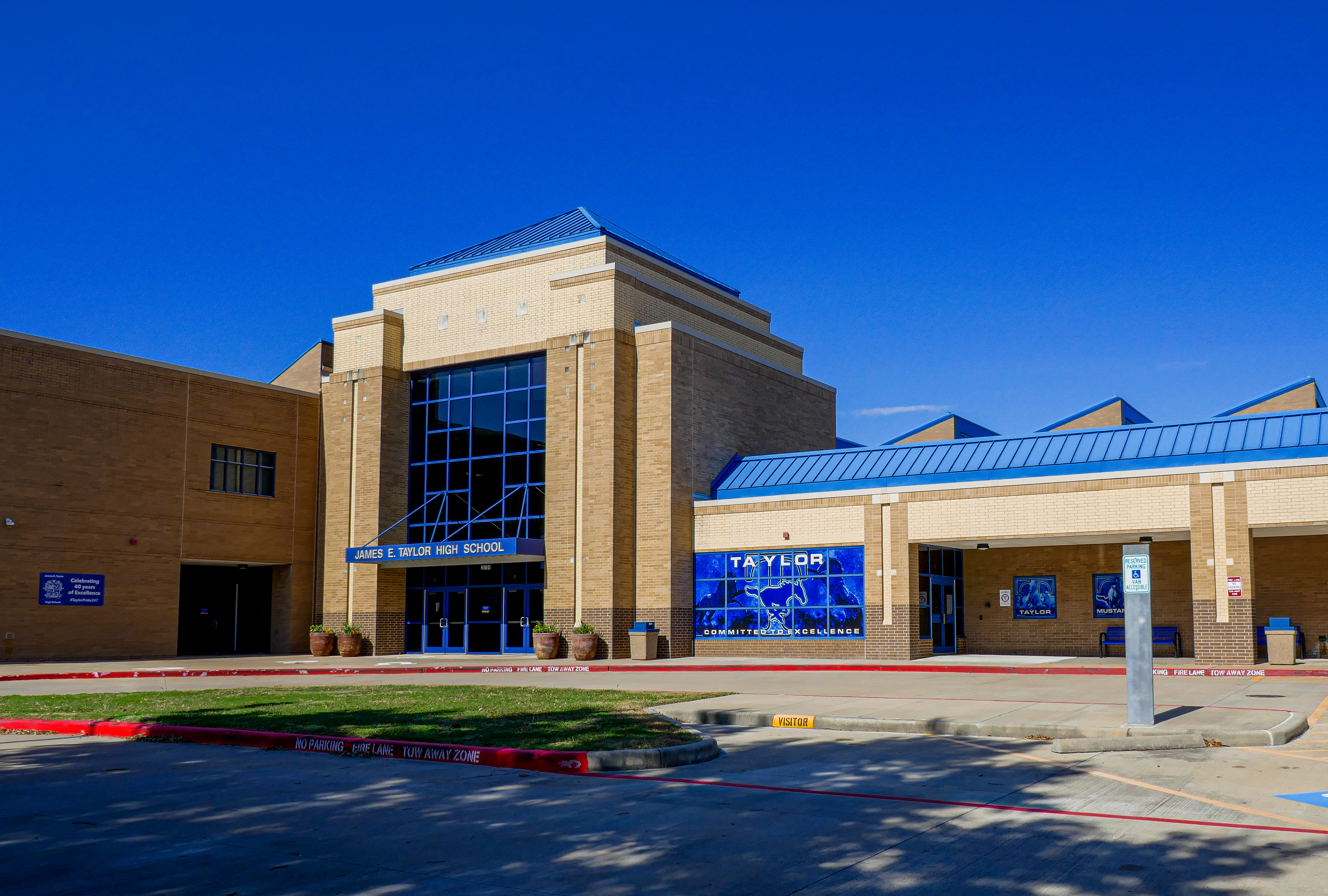

Location
- 20700 Kingsland Boulevard; Katy, Harris County, Texas 77450; United States; 29°46′39″N 95°43′57″W

Information
- Type: Public
- Motto: "Think, Work, Grow"
- Established: 1979
- School district: Katy ISD
- Principal: Melinda Monez
- Faculty: 210
- Teaching staff: 197.27 (FTE)
- Grades: 9–12
- Enrollment: 3,188 (2023–2024)
- Student to teacher ratio: 16.16
- Colors: Royal Blue; White
- Athletics conference: UIL Class 6A
- Mascot: Mustang
- Rivals: Cinco Ranch High School Katy High School; Tompkins High School Seven Lakes High School
- Newspaper: Mane Event
- Yearbook: Stampede
- Website: Official Website

James E. Taylor High School is a public high school in unincorporated Harris County, Texas, in the Greater Katy area. The campus is located within the Nottingham Country subdivision, but is not within the Katy city limits. The school serves grades 9 through 12, and is part of Katy Independent School District.

== History ==
Taylor opened for classes on November 26, 1979. The school was named for James "Jimmy" Edgar Taylor (1912–1997), superintendent of the Katy ISD for 31 years. During his tenure, Katy ISD grew from a Class A district to one with two 5A high schools. Taylor High is a 1996 Blue Ribbon School, and was ranked 1,499 out of all U.S. high schools by U.S. News & World Report in 2022.

== Feeder patterns ==
The following junior high schools feed into Taylor High School.

- Memorial Parkway
- McMeans
- West Memorial (partial)

The following elementary schools feed into Taylor.

- Exley (partial)
- Hayes
- Memorial Parkway
- Nottingham Country
- Pattison
- West Memorial (partial)
- Wolfe (partial)

== Demographics ==
The average household income zoning areas to James E. Taylor High School is 166,986, which is balanced by the higher 77094 zip code with an average income of 207,000 as compared to the 77450 zip code with an average income of 127,000. Taylor High School is in the upper 6.2 percent of Texas high schools for family income.

For the 2022-23 academic year, James E. Taylor High School enrolled 3,085 students, according to the National Center for Education Statistics. The school employed 189.23 full-time equivalent educators, resulting in a student-teacher ratio of 16.3:1.

Enrollment by race and ethnicity (2022-23)
| Race and ethnicity^{†} | Enrolled pupils | Percentage |
|---|---|---|
| African American | 327 | 10.6% |
| Asian | 454 | 14.72% |
| Hispanic | 958 | 31.05% |
| Native American | 7 | 0.23% |
| White | 1,229 | 39.84% |
| Native Hawaiian, Pacific islander | 2 | 0.06% |
| Multi-race | 108 | 3.5% |
| Total | 3,085 | 100% |
^{†} "Hispanic" includes Hispanics of any race. All other categories refer to non-Hispanics.

== Awards and honors ==
=== Academics ===
- 5A Academic Decathlon National Champion: 1997 and 2000
- Academic Decathlon National Runner-up: 1998, 1999, 2001
- 5A Academic Decathlon State Champions: 1995, 1997, 1998, 1999, 2000, 2001
- State nominee for the Presidential Award for Excellence in Mathematics and Science Teaching: 1999
- Texas Business and Education Coalition Just For the Kids Honor Roll: 2003
- Texas Education Agency Exemplary School: 1990, 1991, 1992, 1993, 1994, 1995, 1996, 1997, 1998, 1999, 2000, 2001, 2002, 2003
- UIL 5A Academics State Social Studies Champions: 2005, 2007, 2008, 2011
- UIL 5A Academics State Spelling Champions: 2011
- UIL 5A Academics State Champions: 2004, 2007
- UIL 5A Academics State Computer Science Champions: 2002, 2004, 2005, 2007

=== Engineering and science ===
- TCEA State Programming Champions: 2005, 2008
- American Computer Science League – International Competition First Place: 2006
- HPE Code Wars Champions: 2004, 2006, 2007, 2008
- Texas A&M Regional Science Bowl champions: 2006

== Athletics ==
=== UIL state championships ===
==== Team ====
- Tennis state champion: 1997, 1998, 2002
- Tennis state runner-up: 1995, 1996, 2000
- Tennis state semi-finalist: 1988, 1991, 1999, 2004, 2005, 2006, 2007

==== Girls ====
- Wrestling individual champions: 2007 (Adele Kurt), 2012 (Nina Wyre)
- Soccer: 2006 state champions; 2000, 2001 state runner-up
- Swimming & diving individual state champions: 1986(1), 2003(1), 2019(2), 2020(1)
- Tennis (doubles): 1992, 2008, 2011

==== Boys ====
- Swimming & diving individual state champions: 1986(1), 2000(2), 2001(3), 2003(2), 2004(3), 2005(1)
- Swimming & diving team state champions: 2001, 2003
- Tennis (singles): 2013
- Tennis (doubles): 1984, 2001, 2002
- Track and Field individual champions: 2018(2) discus and shot put (Otito Ogbonnia)

== Notable alumni and staff ==
=== Arts and entertainment ===
- Ryan Binse – film producer
- Janeane Garofalo – comedian and actress
- Kimberly Caldwell – singer, actress, and American Idol season 2 contestant
- Mark Matejka – guitarist for Lynyrd Skynyrd
- Emily Neves – voice actress (class of 2000)
- Renee O'Connor – actress who played Gabrielle on Xena: Warrior Princess
- William "Scarra" Li – Streamer and former professional League of Legends Player

=== Athletics ===
- Andrew Coker – offensive lineman for the TCU Horned Frogs (class of 2019)
- Hayden Conner – offensive guard for the Texas Longhorns (class of 2021)
- Trevor Enders – former Major League Baseball pitcher
- Eugene Espineli – former Major League Baseball pitcher
- Jonathan Garcia – Olympic athlete
- John Meloan – former Major League Baseball pitcher
- Tyler Mizoguchi - artistic gymnast
- Dane Myers - current Major League Baseball center fielder for Cincinnati Reds
- Otito Ogbonnia – professional football player (NFL) for the Los Angeles Chargers (class of 2018)
- Trevor Woods – safety for the Colorado Buffaloes (class of 2021)
- Patrick White – groundbreaking naval architect from the University of Michigan.

=== Politics/Law ===
- Ryan Patrick – former judge of the 177th District Court and former United States Attorney for the Southern District of Texas (class of 1997)
