= Patricia E. Paetow High School =

Public school in Texas, United States

Location
- 23111 Stockdick School Rd. Katy, Harris County, Texas 77493; United States; 29.84496°N 95.77674°W

Information
- Type: Public high school
- Motto: Be the Change
- Established: 2017
- School district: Katy Independent School District
- Staff: 238.17 (FTE)
- Grades: 9-12
- Enrollment: 3,695 (2023-24)
- Student to teacher ratio: 15.51
- Campus type: Suburban
- Colors: Carolina blue, black, and white
- Team name: Panthers
- Website: www.katyisd.org/PHS

Patricia E. Paetow High School is a senior high school in unincorporated Harris County, Texas, in Greater Katy. It is a part of the Katy Independent School District.

The school opened in August 2017 to 9th and 10th grade students, relieving Katy High School and Morton Ranch High School. The more than 635,000-square-foot (59,000 m^{2}) building, with a capacity of 3,000, has three stories. On December 17, 2020, Paetow’s football team had their season cut short due to Covid-19 Outbreak. On December 17, 2021, Paetow won the UIL Football Conference 5A Division 1 State Championship under former Katy High School assistant coach B.J. Gotte, who promptly left after the season for the head coaching position at Pearland High School.

== Feeder patterns ==
The following elementary schools feed into Paetow High School:

- Bethke Elementary School
- Leonard Elementary School
- Faldyn Elementary School (partial)
- Golbow Elementary School (partial)
- King Elementary School (partial)
- McElwain Elementary School (partial)
- McRoberts Elementary School (partial)
- Winborn Elementary School (partial)

The following junior high schools feed into Paetow High School:

- Stockdick Junior High School
- Haskett Junior High School (partial)
- McDonald Junior High School (partial)

== Notable alumni ==
- Daymion Sanford, college football linebacker for the Texas A&M Aggies

== Administration ==
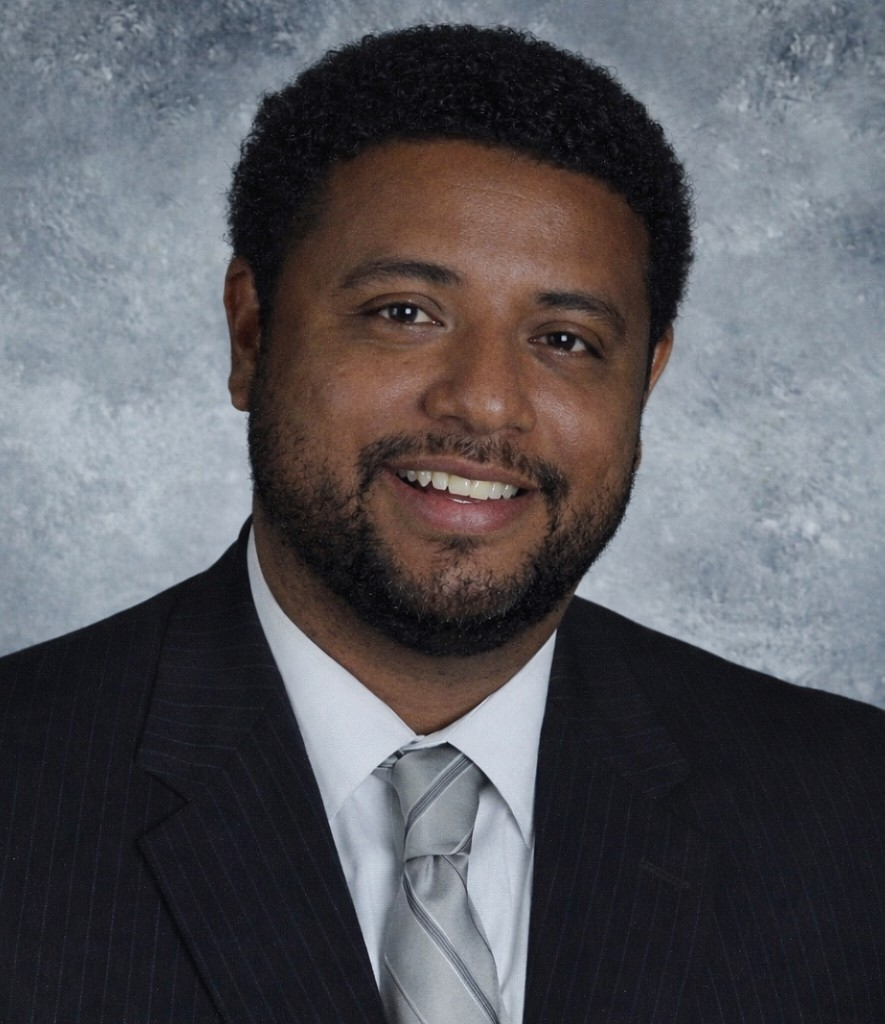
David Paz, the current principal of Paetow High School.

- David Paz has been the school's principal since February 2023.
