= CU Online =

University of Colorado's online degree programs

- Established: 1996
- Location: Office and Administrators in Denver and Boulder, Colorado, United States
- Website: online.cu.edu

CU Online represents the University of Colorado’s fully-online bachelor’s, master’s, doctorate, and certificate programs. Originally launched by the University of Colorado Denver in 1996, it is one of the first fully-accredited online higher education platforms. Today, CU Online offers degree programs from all four University of Colorado campuses – CU Boulder, UCCS, CU Denver, and CU Anschutz Medical Campus.

CU Online initially launched with three online courses. In 2020 CU Online has expanded its catalog to over 50 degree and certificate programs that can be completed entirely online. CU Online programs offer the same curriculum, credit structure, and are taught by the same on-campus professors. The student-faculty ratio also remains the same for both on-campus and online courses (roughly 17:1).

== Program Structure ==
Most CU Online degree programs run on a traditional semester schedule, where they start and stop at the same time as the on-campus classes (Fall, Spring, Summer). As such, the online courses are not "self-paced", but rather are "asynchronous", which means students can log in any time of day or night. The amount of time students are expected to be logged in is dependent upon the professor and degree program.

Each online course is developed to convey and teach the same content and material as its on-campus counterpart, but in a way that’s conducive to the web-based modality. Each student is assigned a homepage in order to:

- Access courses
- Participate in class discussions (threaded discussions and ‘chat’ with peers)
- Find assignments, lectures, and exams

CU Online employs Canvas by Instructure. Canvas is Cloud based, and CU Denver uses it for its completely online courses as well a supplement for the on campus courses in the form of blended learning, which means it doesn’t distinguish between supplemental course use and blended/hybrid courses. With Canvas, professors can record audio and video messages, utilize IOS and Android, RSS support and web conferencing.

== Assignments ==
The online courses that compose CU Online’s degree and certificate programs are typically divided into units of class discussions (ongoing posts of classmate queries and comments), downloadable assignments, and quizzes. What students are actually graded on is based on the course and the professor, however, class participation is usually required in the form of threaded discussions. Similar to a traditional on-campus course, the content of the course is subject to the discretion of the professor.

== Programs ==
The credits earned through CU Online are identical to credits earned through traditional on-campus courses; even if a student completes an entire program online, the degree is awarded with the same benefactor, University of Colorado.

CU Online offers courses in liberal arts and science, arts and media, business, education, engineering, public affairs, healthcare, nursing, and more. The complete list of degree programs and certificates that can be completed exclusively through online courses can be found here.

== Accreditation ==
- The University of Colorado was founded in 1876 and is accredited by the Higher Learning Commission
- The ECE program is accredited by National Council for Accreditation of Teacher Education (NCATE) and nationally recognized by CEC and National Association for the Education of Young Children (NAEYC).
- The Library program is a nationally recognized NCATE-AASL Revised & Approved School Library Media Education Program.
- All Business Schools at CU are accredited by AACSB International.
- The MS in Accounting program at CU Denver Business School is accredited by AACSB International Accounting.
- The Health Administration programs have been recognized by the ACEHSA (Accrediting Commission of Education for Health Services Administration).
