= Cameron Samuels =

American LGBTQ rights activist

- Born: Cameron J. Samuels; United States
- Citizenship: United States
- Education: Seven Lakes High School
- Occupation: Activist
- Website: studentsengaged.org

Cameron Samuels is an American activist who is known for their (Note: Samuels uses they/them gender-neutral pronouns.) advocacy and opposition to LGBTQ website and book bans in schools. Samuels is the executive director of the organization SEAT, Students Engaged in Advancing Texas.

== LGBTQ website access advocacy ==
Samuels is also known for their campaign for school access to LGBTQ websites. When Samuels was enrolled at Seven Lakes High School in Katy, Texas as a freshman they attempted to access The Advocate magazine website. Samuels later said in an NBC News interview, "I received a page that said that website was blocked because it was under the category of 'alternative sexual lifestyles, GLBT.'" Other LGBTQ related websites such as The Trevor Project were also blocked.

In November 2021, Cameron stood by themself in front of the school board to oppose the district's censorship efforts and the detrimental impact on marginalized students. Following Samuels presentation they received no applause. Yet Samuel and other students began a movement, later packing future school board meetings with ardent students.

After Samuels marshalled together additional students, the school district removed the ban on the Montrose Center website, a nearby Texas LGBTQ group in the state. A month later the district stopped restrictions on websites for the Human Rights Campaign, the United States biggest LGBTQ advocacy group, PFLAG, a supporter of LGBTQ people and their families, GLSEN, an LGBTQ students rights organization, aklong with other websites.

With the combined power of students, teachers and parents, a petition of over 2,000 signatures, book drive distribution of several titles, and the assistance of the American Civil Liberties Union and Lambda Legal, the web content filter was dropped from Katy Independent School District computers.

== Book ban activism ==
In 2022, the Katy Independent School District took nine books off the school library shelves that were all in relation to race or LGBTQ issues.

Samuels and other students assembled book drives at public spaces throughout the district. Samuels later stated that at a Jordon High School book distribution event over 80 people attended, some were students that were secretly LGBTQ out of fear they would not supported by friends and family. These same closeted students took books that affirmed their identity.

== Senate Judiciary Committee testimony ==
On September 12, 2023, Samuels testified before the Senate Judiciary Committee with Democratic Illinois Secretary of State Alexi Giannoulias and other advocates for and against school book bans.

Secretary Giannoulias spoke of Illinois' recent anti-book ban legislation and how more U.S. states could follow Illinois example. Other debate topics were books that were sexually explicit, restrictions based on age of explicit books, parents rights, diversity of thought and censorship. The graphic novel Maus was also referenced at the book bans Senate hearing.

Republican Senator John Kennedy during the hearing read aloud explicit excerpts of the book All Boys Aren't Blue.

The hearing was broadcast on C-SPAN.

== Senate hearing aftermath ==
Samuels spoke with Brandeis University's Brandeis Stories regarding the experience of testifying before the Senate answering, "I am humbled to have had a seat at the table in our nation's policymaking, and my journey to this platform certainly was not easy," adding, "I never could have imagined that I would be invited to testify before the U.S. Senate Judiciary Committee on an issue so personal to me."

After graduating from Seven Lakes High School in 2022, Samuels went on to enroll at Brandeis University with a major in politics and minor in journalism.

== Awards ==
Samuels was a 2022 winner of The Diller Teen Tikkun Olam Awards for LGBTQ+ activism and advocacy.

In April 2023, Samuels was also given the Trailblazer Award by the Human Rights Campaign.

== External reviews ==
- Official website
- Cameron Samuels at IMDb
- Get Caught Reading article
