= Memorial Parkway =

Memorial Parkway may refer to:

- Memorial Parkway (Huntsville), Alabama, a freeway that carries US 231 and US 431
- Memorial Parkway, Texas, a neighborhood in Harris County
- Utica Parks and Parkway Historic District, in Utica, New York
