= Electric Touch (band) =

American rock band

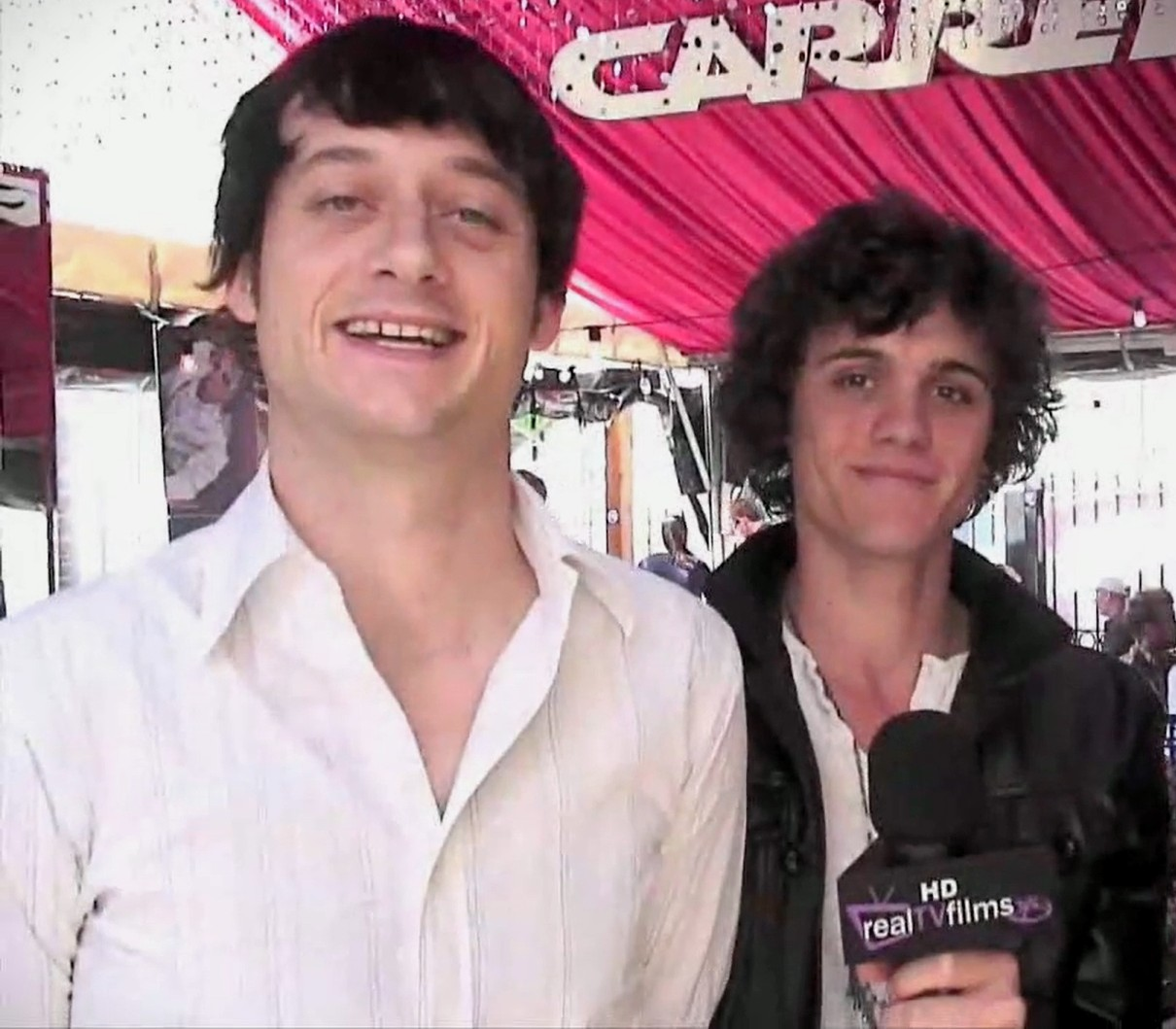
- Left to right: Shane Lawlor, Christopher Leigh in 2009

Background information
- Origin: Nottingham Country, Texas
- Genres: Rock
- Years active: 2008–2012
- Members: Shane Lawlor; Louis Messina Jr.; Christopher Leigh; Portland Musser; Isaac Strycker

Electric Touch was an American rock band, consisting of Shane Lawlor on lead vocals/guitar/piano, Louis Messina Jr. on drums, Christopher Leigh on lead guitar/vocals, Portland Musser on bass, and Isaac Strycker on keys/vocals.

They performed with popular acts Heart, Weezer, Evanescence, Foo Fighters, The Cars, Rival Sons, Hot Chelle Rae, The Bravery, Peelander-Z, Paramore, The Airborne Toxic Event, Bon Jovi, and Our Lady Peace, among others.

== History ==
The band was composed of four Americans and one British singer, Lawlor, who came from Nottingham Country, Texas and met up with Leigh and his twin Messina Jr, both natives of Houston. The three recorded a demo, soon signed to the Houston indie label Justice Records and their self-titled album was released on August 31, 2008. The band later released the single "Sounds From the Underground", debuting at #1 on FMQB's Commercial Specialty SubModern Chart. In 2009, Electric Touch signed with Island Records and went to New York to write their second studio album, which was recorded in Los Angeles with Howard Benson.

In 2009, they performed at Coachella, Lollapalooza (20th Anniversary), Austin City Limits Festival, SXSW, Buzzfest, Edgefest and Vans Warped Tour, and performed as opening act for Evanescence, Unwritten Law and Heart at ACL Live at the Moody Theater and on The Beautiful Freaks Tour with Hot Chelle Rae. Their performances at Coachella and Lollapalooza garnered a recommendation from The Wall Street Journal music critic Jim Fusilli

Their second album, Never Look Back, was released on March 20, 2012, on Island Records. It was recorded by Howard Benson and mixed by Chris Lord-Alge and Mike Plotnikoff.

== Discography ==
- Electric Touch (2008)
- Never Look Back (2012)
