= Daymion Sanford =

American football player (born 2005)

No. 27 – Texas A&M Aggies
- Position: Linebacker
- Class: Junior

Personal information
- Born: February 22, 2005 (age 21)
- Listed height: 6 ft 2 in (1.88 m)
- Listed weight: 230 lb (104 kg)

Career information
- High school: Paetow (Katy, Texas)
- College: Texas A&M (2023–present)
- Stats at ESPN

Daymion Sanford (born February 22, 2005) is an American college football linebacker for the Texas A&M Aggies.

== Early life ==
Sanford attended Patricia E. Paetow High School in Katy, Texas. In his high school career, he totaled 150 tackles, 25 sacks, and five interceptions. Sanford committed to play college football at Texas A&M University.

== College career ==
As a freshman, Sanford totaled four tackles. He earned significantly increased playing time as a junior. Against Mississippi State, Sanford recorded nine tackles, a sack, and his first career interception. Against Missouri, he tallied five tackles, two tackles for loss, one sack and a forced fumble. As a result, he was named the Southeastern Conference Co-Defensive Player of the Week.
