= Detroit Homecoming =

Detroit Homecoming is an invitation-only event sponsored by Crain Communications aims to engage Detroit natives in civic and economic dutties in the city. It began in 2014 with a commitment to be an annual event for at least 3 years. The event continued for 10 years during which more than 950 former Detroit residents attended. Putting a dollar figure on investments inspired by Homecoming is tricky, because every large investment has many inspirations and partners. But just the top 10 completed investments and donations having strong Homecoming ties top $1 billion.

The first Homecoming took place in September, 2014, with an invitation list focused on what the Detroit News described as, "the elite: billionaires, sports stars, company presidents, venture capitalists, journalists and entertainers." Among the event's planned highlights was a conversation between DanGilbert and Warren Buffett entitled, "Why I’m Bullish on Detroit."

Interviewed during the Homecoming, Rachel Jacobs, a Detroit expat living in New York said, "Detroit doesn’t need ideas. It has phenomenal ideas. It needs doers," referring to her own organization, Detroit Nation, a web-based group of former Detroiters working to help their hometown.
