= Johnathan Hall =

American football player

No. 7 – Utah Utes
- Position: Linebacker
- Class: Senior

Personal information
- Listed height: 6 ft 1 in (1.85 m)
- Listed weight: 226 lb (103 kg)

Career information
- High school: Katy (Katy, Texas)
- College: Utah (2023–present)
- Stats at ESPN

Johnathan Hall is an American college football linebacker for the Utah Utes.

== Early life ==
Hall attended Katy High School in Katy, Texas. He was rated as a three-star recruit by 247Sports, and committed to play college football for the Utah Utes over offers from other schools such as Texas, LSU, Florida State, Arkansas, Texas Tech, TCU, Nebraska, and Purdue.

== College career ==
As a freshman in 2023, Hall played in 13 games with one start, recording 19 tackles with one being for a loss, and a sack. Heading into the 2024 season, he switched from playing safety to linebacker. Hall finished the 2024 season with 38 tackles with nine being for a loss, a sack, four pass deflections, and an interception. In week 2 of the 2025 season, he notched an interception in a victory versus Cal Poly. Hall started all 13 games on the season, racking up 67 tackles, two and a half sacks, an interception, and four pass deflections.
