= Memorial Parkway, Texas =

Coordinates: 29°45′57″N 95°44′40″W

Memorial Parkway is a neighborhood in unincorporated Harris County, Texas, United States, east of the city of Katy.

Memorial Parkway was built in the 1970s, and the 1980s. The neighborhood is operated by the Memorial Parkway Homeowners Association (MPHOA). It is one of the oldest subdivisions on the Mason Road corridor. It is flanked on the west by the expanding commercial corridor of Mason Road, and on the East by the residential parkway of Westgreen Boulevard.

== Schools ==
All pupils who live in Memorial Parkway go to schools in the Katy Independent School District. The following schools are in Memorial Parkway:

- Hayes Elementary
- Memorial Parkway Elementary
- Memorial Parkway Junior High School

In addition, James E. Taylor High School serves Memorial Parkway.
