= Jordan High School (Fulshear, Texas) =

Public school in Texas, United States

Coordinates: 29°43′13″N 95°51′18″W

Location
- 27500 Fulshear Bend Drive; Fulshear, Texas 77441

Information
- Type: Public High School
- Established: 2020
- Locale: Suburban
- School district: Katy Independent School District
- NCES District ID: 4825170
- Educational authority: Texas Education Agency
- Superintendent: Ken Gregorski
- CEEB code: 440553
- NCES School ID: 482517013663
- Principal: Ethan Crowell
- Teaching staff: 192.31 (FTE)
- Gender: Coeducational
- Enrollment: 3,330 (2024-2025)
  - Grade 9: 857
  - Grade 10: 921
  - Grade 11: 805
  - Grade 12: 747
- Student to teacher ratio: 17.32
- Colors: Black and gold
- Mascot: Warriors
- SAT average: 1158
- Website: Official website

Jordan High School is a senior high school in Fulshear, Texas. It is a part of the Katy Independent School District (KISD) and opened to students in the fall of 2020, being widely considered one of the top KatyISD schools since then.

It was collectively named after the Jordan family, which has strong roots to both Katy and KISD. The building had a cost of over $206 million, and its size is above 650,000 square feet (60,000 m^{2}) of space. It has three gymnasiums, an eight-lane, 25-yard (75 ft) natatorium, a 900-seat performing arts center, 9 tennis courts, a football field, and a baseball stadium with a smaller softball stadium. All the grade levels share the school equally; there are no segregated grade level areas. Jordan High School also has 2 cafeterias to fit its many students, with one being significantly larger than the other.

Jordan opened in the fall of 2020 with only freshmen and sophomores but grew to house juniors and seniors as of the 2022-2023 school year. The first class that graduated from the school was the Class of 2023.

It took territory from Seven Lakes High School and Obra D. Tompkins High School, and is the ninth comprehensive high school that its school district has established. It is also the biggest high school in Katy ISD.

Jordan High School receives students from Adams Junior High School and Seven Lakes Junior High School. Jordan High School is known for its achievements in sports and extracurricular activities.

== Feeder Patterns ==
The following elementary schools feed into Jordan High School.

- Campbell Elementary School
- Jenks Elementary School
- Randolph Elementary School
- Shafer Elementary School
- Stanley Elementary School
- Wolman Elementary School

The following junior high schools feed into Jordan High School.

- Adams Junior High
- Seven Lakes Junior High (partial)

== Achievements ==
=== Academics ===
• The Jordan High School Science Olympiad Team placed second in the Texas State competition of 2026, qualifying for the national tournament

· Science Olympiad-Placed Third in State (tied with 2nd but lost tie-breaker)

• The Jordan High School Quizbowl Team advanced to 2023 HS National Championship Tournament and 2025 HS National Championship Tournament

· Academic Decathlon State Competition

· Debate Top Ten State School (Texas Forensics Association)

· Original Oratory State Champion at the Texas Forensic Association State Tournament in 2025

· Lincoln Douglas Debate Top Speaker at the Texas Forensic Association State Tournament in 2025

=== Theatre ===
· UIL One Act Play: Honorable Mention All-Star Cast, All-Star Cast and Outstanding Technician

· Texas Thespian State Festival Officers, Superior Ratings and National Qualifiers

=== Band ===
· Color Guard Outstanding Awards and Recognition

· UIL Choir Concert and Sight-Reading Sweepstakes Recipients

· Grand Champions and Katy Cup winners of the Katy Marching Band Festival

· UIL State and Region Band Recognition

· Orchestra UIL Concert and Sight-Reading Sweepstakes

· JHS Symphony Orchestra invited to the National Orchestra

· JHS Symphony Orchestra performed in NYC

· Festival of American String Teachers Association Conference

· 75% of Band Solos/Ensembles earned Division 1 ranking at state

=== Athletics ===
· Wrestling State Champion

· Swimming State Champion

· Top Boys Soccer Program in the Region

• Technology Students Association have advanced to national level competition in 2022,2023 and 2024

· Tennis Singles State Champions (As of 2022-2023 school year)

=== Extracurriculars ===
• The Jordan High School Quizbowl Team won Bastrop Invitational District Tournament in 2025

• The Jordan High School Quizbowl Team won 2021 JV State Championship and 2022 JV State Championship

• VEX Robotics team 19697Z won the 2025 UIL 6A Texas State Championship in VEX Robotics, as well as the Excellence Award at the Houston Regional Championship

• Two VEX Robotics teams from Jordan High School, 19697Z and 19697W, are part of the top 10 teams in the Texas State Skills Rankings as of 2025

• Total of 4 VEX Robotics teams from Jordan High School advanced to VEX Texas State Championship Tournament in 2023 and 2024

• Total of 6 VEX Robotics teams from Jordan High School advanced to VEX Texas State Championship Tournament in 2024 and 2025

• FRC team 8576 Jordan High School Golden Warriors Robotics advanced to FIRST World Championship Tournament in 2023 and 2024

• FRC team 8576 Jordan High School Golden Warriors Robotics won Texas State tournament in 2023

• FRC Team 8576 Jordan High School Golden Warriors Robotics won Katy District Competition in 2024

• FRC Team 8576 Jordan High School Golden Warriors Robotics won Creativity award and Quality award in 2025

== Demographics ==
As of 2024, the school's demographics were:

·White 34%

·Hispanic 27%

·Asian 24%

·Black 8%

·Two or More Races 4%

·Native American <1%

·Native Hawaiian/Pacific Islander <1%

== Notable alumni ==
- Andrew Marsh, college football wide receiver for the Michigan Wolverines
- Michael Guo, #6 ranked junior table tennis player for USA Table Tennis
