= Practice XYZ =

American educational technology company

Practice XYZ, Inc.
- Trade name: Practice
- Formerly: ApprenNet, Inc.
- Company type: Private
- Industry: Education
- Founded: 2011
- Founders: Emily Foote, Karl Okamoto
- Defunct: 2017
- Fate: Acquired
- Successor: Instructure
- Headquarters: Philadelphia, United States
- Area served: United States
- Products: Educational software
- Owner: Instructure
- Number of employees: 22 (2017)
- Website: info.apprennet.com

Practice, formerly known as ApprenNet, was a Philadelphia-based educational technology startup company that developed video based learning systems. The company was founded in 2011 and was acquired by Instructure an American learning systems company in 2017.

== History ==
The company was founded in 2011 by Emily Foote and Drexel University School of Law Professor Karl Okamoto. Okamoto developed the idea for the company in 2009 when he created LawMeets, an online competition similar to a moot court.

ApprenNet launched a version of LawMeets as an intellectual property in 2011. With LawMeets, students enact their response to a legal problem and receive feedback.

ApprenNet next added K12Meets, a program enabling teachers to practice their classroom techniques, and created a training program for employees at a Philadelphia restaurant.

In 2012, the National Science Foundation awarded Okamoto a $500,000 grant to expand LawMeets' approach to learning in other disciplines.

In 2013, ApprenNet was one of five startup companies selected to participate in the University of Pennsylvania's Education Design Studio Inc. (EDSi), an innovation incubator dedicated to funding and launching education technology companies.

In 2015, Rachel Jacobs became the company's CEO. Following Jacobs's death in May 2015, ApprenNet merged with Handsfree Learning of California.

In 2016, ApprenNet changed its name to Practice XYZ, Inc.

In 2017, the company was acquired by American education technology company Instructure.
