= Andrew Coker =

American football player (born 2001)

Profile
- Position: Offensive tackle

Personal information
- Born: March 23, 2001 (age 25); Houston, Texas, U.S.
- Listed height: 6 ft 7 in (2.01 m)
- Listed weight: 315 lb (143 kg)

Career information
- High school: James E. Taylor (TX)
- College: TCU (2019–2023)
- NFL draft: 2024: undrafted

Career history
- Las Vegas Raiders (2024)*; Cincinnati Bengals (2024–2025)*; Cleveland Browns (2026)*
- * Offseason or practice squad member only
- Stats at Pro Football Reference

Andrew Coker (born March 23, 2001) is an American professional football offensive tackle. He played college football for the TCU Horned Frogs.

== Early life ==
From Katy, Texas, Coker attended James E. Taylor High School and played football and basketball. He started at offensive lineman for the football team for three seasons, being an honorable mention all-district player as a sophomore, second-team all-district player as a junior and a first-team All-Texas selection by Dave Campbell's Texas Football as a senior. Ranked the 48th-best offensive tackle nationally and the 60th-best player in Texas by 247Sports, Coker committed to play college football for the TCU Horned Frogs after having flipped from the Florida Gators.

== College career ==
Coker redshirted as a true freshman at TCU in 2019, appearing in three games. He started eight games as a right tackle in 2020 and became a key player in 2021, starting all 12 games while being one of only two on the TCU line to do so that year. He was an important part of the team in 2022, starting all 15 games as they reached the national championship, while being named honorable mention All-Big 12 Conference. After returning as a starter for the 2023 season, Coker declared for the 2024 NFL draft. He received an invite to the East–West Shrine Bowl.

== Professional career ==
Pre-draft measurables
Height	Weight	Arm length	Hand span	Wingspan	40-yard dash	10-yard split	20-yard split	20-yard shuttle	Three-cone drill	Vertical jump	Broad jump	Bench press
6 ft 6 7/8 in (2.00 m)	315 lb (143 kg)	34 in (0.86 m)	9 1/2 in (0.24 m)	6 ft 9 in (2.06 m)	5.36 s	1.85 s	3.09 s	4.93 s	7.95 s	25.5 in (0.65 m)	7 ft 10 in (2.39 m)	24 reps
All values from NFL Combine/Pro Day

=== Las Vegas Raiders ===
Coker signed with the Las Vegas Raiders as an undrafted free agent on April 27, 2024. He was also selected by the Birmingham Stallions in the seventh round of the 2024 UFL draft on July 17. He was waived on August 27.

=== Cincinnati Bengals ===
On October 22, 2024, Coker was signed to the Cincinnati Bengals' practice squad. He signed a reserve/future contract with the Bengals on January 7, 2025.

On August 26, 2025, Coker was waived by the Bengals as part of final roster cuts and re-signed to the practice squad the next day. He signed a reserve/future contract with Cincinnati on January 5, 2026.

On August 30, 2026, Coker was waived by the Bengals as a part of final roster cuts.

=== Cleveland Browns ===
On October 20, 2026, Coker signed with the Cleveland Browns practice squad. On November 3, he was released.
