= Rachel Jacobs =

American social entrepreneur and CEO

- Born: October 3, 1975; Huntington Woods, Michigan, U.S.
- Died: May 12, 2015 (aged 39); Philadelphia, Pennsylvania, U.S.
- Education: Swarthmore College (BA); Columbia Business School (MBA)
- Occupation: Businesswoman
- Spouse: Todd Waldman
- Children: 1
- Relatives: Gilda Jacobs (mother)

Rachel Jacobs (October 3, 1975 – May 12, 2015) was an American businesswoman and social entrepreneur. She was killed at age 39 in the 2015 Philadelphia train derailment while commuting between her home in New York and the Philadelphia offices of ApprenNet, the educational technology company she had recently joined as CEO.

== Early life and education ==
Jacobs grew up in Huntington Woods, Michigan, the daughter of Gilda Jacobs, a former Michigan state senator. She was a 1993 graduate of Berkley High School, a 1997 graduate of Swarthmore College, and a 2002 graduate of Columbia Business School. Jacobs moved to New York City in 2000.

== Career ==
Jacobs was CEO of ApprenNet, a video-learning tech company which was cofounded by Karl Okamoto, a law professor at Drexel University. The company "provides tools for instructors to create video-based learning exercises." Before joining ApprenNet, Jacobs worked for the education-technology firm Ascend Learning where she was vice president of business innovation. According to Okamoto, the two met because ApprenNet was doing business with Ascend and Jacobs "was our customer before she became our colleague."

In a career The Washington Post described as "moving from one big job to the next," Jacobs' first job out of business school was as a manager at the Pragma Corporation, based in Kyrgyzstan, where she helped the government develop IT strategies. She next worked for the Eurasia Group, a political risk consultancy. In 2007, Jacobs joined McGraw Hill, where she "led the expansion of McGraw-Hill's career-learning business into China, India and the Middle East."

Jacobs was hired to lead ApprenNet, which is backed by the National Science Foundation, in an expansion from its original focus on educating lawyers, into a phase to apply its online teaching technology to training health-care professionals, college level instruction and training for K-12 teachers.

Following Jacobs's death, ApprenNet merged with Handsfree Learning of California.

=== Social activism ===
In 2009, Jacobs organized 635 Mile Road, a non-profit organization of former Detroit-area residents "dedicated to improving the flow of funds, ideas and energy between native Detroiters." By the end of 2010, 635 Mile Road became Detroit Nation. The organization soon had chapters in chapters in New York, Seattle, Chicago, and other cities dedicated to helping Detroit natives who continue supporting the region after moving away. The group offers free consulting to Detroit-based, grassroots entrepreneurs and artists. Through Detroit Nation, Jacobs helped arrange the Detroit Symphony Orchestra's first Carnegie Hall concert in 17 years. By the time the group held a Detroit ex-pats meet-up in their hometown in 2014, the group had 10,000 members online. Detroit Nation raised money for Detroit charities with fund-raising events held by expats in Seattle, Chicago, New York and other cities, but, as Jacobs explained to an interviewer in 2011, the ex-pats also provide "human capital... helping organizations to better integrate social networking tools, develop marketing materials, or structure the organization and bring in larger donors."

In 2014, Jacobs was one of 150 business leaders invited to attend the first annual Detroit Homecoming. Interviewed during the Homecoming, Jacobs told The Detroit News that, "Detroit doesn't need ideas. It has phenomenal ideas. It needs doers... My challenge to expats is who will raise their hand and be a doer in Detroit?"

== Personal life ==
She was married to Todd Waldman, who as of 2015 worked for Navigant Consulting; the couple had one son. Jacobs and Waldman had been considering whether to move the family to Philadelphia.

== Death ==
Media attention focused on Jacobs in the hours after the crash because she was known to have been on the train but had not been identified among the injured and the dead. ApprenNet co-founder and COO Emily Foote went to the crash scene to try to locate Jacobs by showing her photograph to survivors and rescue workers.

Hundreds of people attended memorial services held at the Greenwich Village campus of Hebrew Union College on Saturday, May 16, 2015. An estimated 1,500 people attended the funeral held in suburban Detroit on May 18, 2015.

== Legacy ==
According to CNN, Jacobs' family have set up two memorial funds in her honor, including the "Rachel Jacobs Detroit Nation Fund" to benefit Detroit Nation and a scholarship fund at Columbia Business School to benefit social entrepreneurs.

Former campers and counselors who had spent summers with Rachel at Tamarack Camps, located in the state of Michigan, came together and raised money to dedicate the Rachel Jacobs Tikkun Olam Leadership Award. Rachel often spoke to others about how her camp experiences help shape her identity during her formative years. Beginning in 2016, this award will go to one summer staff member each year who embodies Rachel's values for healing or repairing the world (the Hebrew translation of Tikkun Olam).

Daily News columnist Mike Lupica demanded a full investigation of Amtrak safety from the National Transportation Safety Board to prevent future tragedies in which a two-year-old child "grows up without a mother." Assigned to ride on the first train through Philadelphia after the derailment, columnist Ronnie Polaneczky wrote for The Philadelphia Inquirer that, "The next time I sigh that I can't afford to fix the roof or haven't time to help a friend move across the country, I will try to remind myself that Rachel Jacobs would have given anything to still be here to indulge such petty worries."
