= Seven Lakes High School =

Coordinates: 29°42′26″N 95°48′28″W

Location
- 9251 South Fry Road; Katy, Texas 77494; United States

Information
- Type: Public school
- Established: 2005
- School district: Katy Independent School District
- School code: SLHS
- NCES School ID: 482517010760
- Principal: Kerri Finnesand
- Teaching staff: 212.42 (on an FTE basis)}
- Grades: 9–12
- Enrollment: 3,773 (2024-2025)
- Student to teacher ratio: 17.76
- Campus size: 124 acres (50 ha)
- Campus type: Suburban
- Colors: Navy blue, orange, white
- Team name: Spartans
- Accreditation: SACS, TEA, CEEB, TACAC, TASSP
- Newspaper: The Torch
- Yearbook: The Odyssey
- Feeder schools: Beckendorff Junior High School; Seven Lakes Junior High School
- Website: www.katyisd.org/SLHS
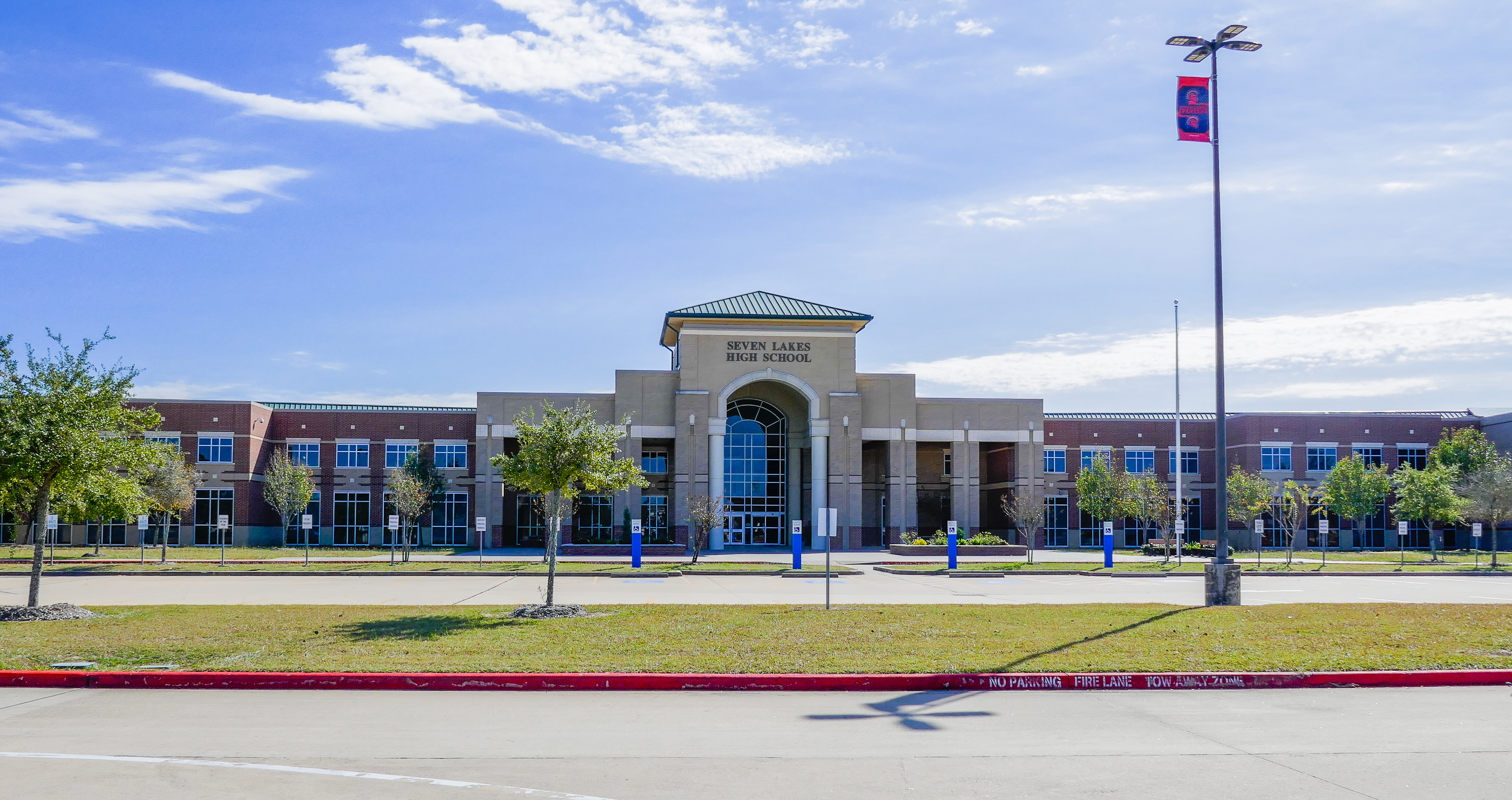

Seven Lakes High School (SLHS) is a public senior high school located in Fort Bend County, Texas, United States, inside the Cinco Ranch area south of the city of Katy. Many communities such as Seven Meadows, Grand Lakes, and Cinco Ranch are zoned to the school. While the school has a Katy address, it is within the extraterritorial jurisdiction of Houston, and is a high school of the Katy Independent School District (KISD).

== History ==
The school was originally planned by Katy ISD to relieve overcrowding at Cinco Ranch High School and Katy High School and to better facilitate the influx of students due to new development planned in the general Katy area. The school plan was the same general design used for two other KISD schools, Morton Ranch High School and Cinco Ranch High School, and was designed by PBK Architects. The school's first year in operation was the 2005–2006 school year and had its first graduating class of 408 students in the 2007–2008 school year. The school was nominated a "National Blue Ribbon School of 2008."

=== COVID-19 ===
In March 2020, in accordance with the rest of the schools in the Katy Independent School District, classes, campus events, field trips, student trips and competitions were postponed as a result of the COVID-19 pandemic in Texas. On April 17, the school was shut down for the rest of the academic school year in accordance with Gov. Greg Abbott’s orders. Virtual learning was put in place using Canvas, and was extended throughout the 2020-2021 school year during which two options were offered for returning students. The first involved in-person instruction, combining face-to-face teaching with digital learning through Canvas, including daily attendance tracking. The second option, the Katy Virtual Academy (KVA), offered real-time, live instruction via Canvas, allowing students to follow the KISD curriculum and meet Texas graduation requirements. Both in-person and virtual students adhered to the same grading guidelines, but the attendance requirement for the fall 2020 final exam eligibility was waived, allowing high school students to exempt a final exam if they met semester average and behavior requirements.

A temporary closure occurred on October 30, due to 43 students testing positive for coronavirus. Following a Corrective Action Advisement from the Fort Bend County Health and Human Services Department, the closure involved providing intermittent virtual learning for in-person students until November 3, with a planned return to in-person learning for both students and staff on November 4.

Schools were reopened in person for the 2021-2022 school year.

== Background ==
The school is located in the Katy Independent School District, and has the distinction of being the largest high school construction project at one time in the state of Texas. Seven Lakes was designed by PBK Architects, as were many other area schools. It was also the second largest, as well as the most expensive, school in the United States when it was opened. The total cost of the school came around to $77,424,704 after construction was complete. The name of the school is derived from two major communities that are zoned to it, Seven Meadows and Grand Lakes, taking "Seven" from the name of the Seven Meadows community and "Lakes" from the name of the Grand Lakes community. While the school is meant only for a maximum of 3,000 students, as with many other schools in KatyISD, it quickly became overcrowded due to the rapid development in the area. Seven Lakes reached its peak of 3,957 students in 2012 before many students were zoned to Tompkins High School.

The school maintains a rivalry of sorts with Cinco Ranch High School, another high school also located in the same school district as Seven Lakes (Katy Independent School District) and located 3 miles away. Logically, much of the area now zoned to Seven Lakes was originally zoned to Cinco Ranch High School before Seven Lakes opened, and much of the area zoned to the new Tompkins High School was previously zoned to Seven Lakes.

== Demographics ==
As of 2023–2024, the school's demographics were:

- Native American/ Alaskan Nat: 0.3%
- Asian: 33.5%
- Black: 7.4%
- Hispanic/Latino: 24.1%
- White: 31.1%
- Two or More Races: 3.6%

== Campus ==
Gilbane Building Co. built the school and PBK Architects designed the school.

The school has the following facilities:

- 615,000 square feet (57,100 m^{2})
- Natatorium with diving equipment
- 9 tennis courts
- Weight lifting room
- Aux. Weight Room
- 900 computers
- Wireless technology
- Performing Arts Center
- Black Box Theater
- 2 dark rooms
- 2 science labs
- 1 science prep area
- 4 art labs with courtyard
- Fine Arts Hallway with art rooms, a band hall, orchestra room and choir room

== Academics ==
Seven Lakes offered 33 Advanced Placement courses during the 2024-25 school year in a variety of subject areas. 1,893 students took 5,410 AP exams in 2025, with 94% scoring a 3 or higher.

Seven Lakes students averaged a score of 1205 on the SAT in the 2024-25 school year, compared with the Texas state average of 978. Students averaged a score of 27.2 on the ACT, compared to the Katy ISD average of 24.9.

== Athletics ==
=== State championships ===
- 2007 Texas 4A Boys Cross Country State Champions
- 2011 5A Wrestling
- 2013 5A Wrestling
- 2018 6A Boys 4 × 100 m Relay
- 2020 6A Volleyball
- 2021 6A Spirit
- 2022 6A Spirit
- 2023 6A Boys Soccer
- 2024 6A Boys Soccer

== Activities ==
=== National championships ===
- 2018 American Prize in Orchestral Performance, High School Division
- 2023 American Prize in Orchestral Performance, High School Division
- 2024 American Prize in Orchestral Performance, High School Division
- 2025 Division C Science Olympiad National Champions
- 2025 American Prize in Orchestral Performance, High School Division

=== State championships ===
- 2008 4A UIL Academic Decathlon
- 2008 Texas 4A UIL Social Studies
- 2010 5A UIL Academic Decathlon
- 2010 4A UIL Social Studies
- 2010 5A UIL Current Issues/Events
- 2010 5A UIL Spelling
- 2011 5A UIL Current Issues/Events
- 2011 5A UIL Spelling
- 2012 5A UIL Spelling
- 2012 5A UIL Literary Criticism
- 2012 5A UIL Current Issues/Events
- 2012 5A UIL Computer Science
- 2016 TMEA Honor Full Orchestra (State Championship)
- 2018 Division C Science Olympiad State Champions
- 2019 Division C Science Olympiad State Champions
- 2020 TMEA Honor Full Orchestra (State Championship)
- 2021 Division C Science Olympiad State Champions
- 2022 Division C Science Olympiad State Champions
- 2023 6A UIL Calculator Applications
- 2023 6A UIL Congressional Debate
- 2023 Division C Science Olympiad State Champions
- 2024 TMEA Honor String Orchestra (State Championship)
- 2024 Division C Science Olympiad State Champions
- 2026 Academic Decathlon (Frisco)

== Enrollment trends ==
- 2012-2013 School Year = 3,957 Students (926 graduating seniors)
- 2013-2014 School Year = 3,584 Students (988 graduating seniors)
- 2014-2015 School Year = 3,464 Students (1,003 graduating seniors)
- 2024-2025 School Year = 3,719 Students (889 graduating seniors)

== Feeder patterns ==
=== Elementary Schools ===
The following elementary schools feed into Seven Lakes (non-comprehensive):

- Fred & Patti Shafer Elementary (partial)
- Roosevelt Alexander Elementary
- Bonnie Holland Elementary
- Michael Griffin Elementary (partial)
- Odessa Kilpatrick Elementary (partial)
- Stan C. Stanley Elementary (partial)
- Tom Wilson Elementary (partial)

=== Middle Schools/Junior High Schools ===
The following middle schools feed into Seven Lakes High School:

- Beckendorff Junior High School
- Seven Lakes Junior High School (partial)

== Notable alumni ==
- Caleb Benenoch — NFL guard
- Conner Capel — MLB outfielder
- Jon Duplantier — MLB pitcher
- Donnie Hart — MLB pitcher
- Lina Hidalgo — Harris County, Texas judge
- Michael Nelson — soccer player
- Sage Northcutt — American mixed martial artist
- Cameron Samuels — LGBTQ Activist
