= Obra D. Tompkins High School =

Public school in Texas, United States

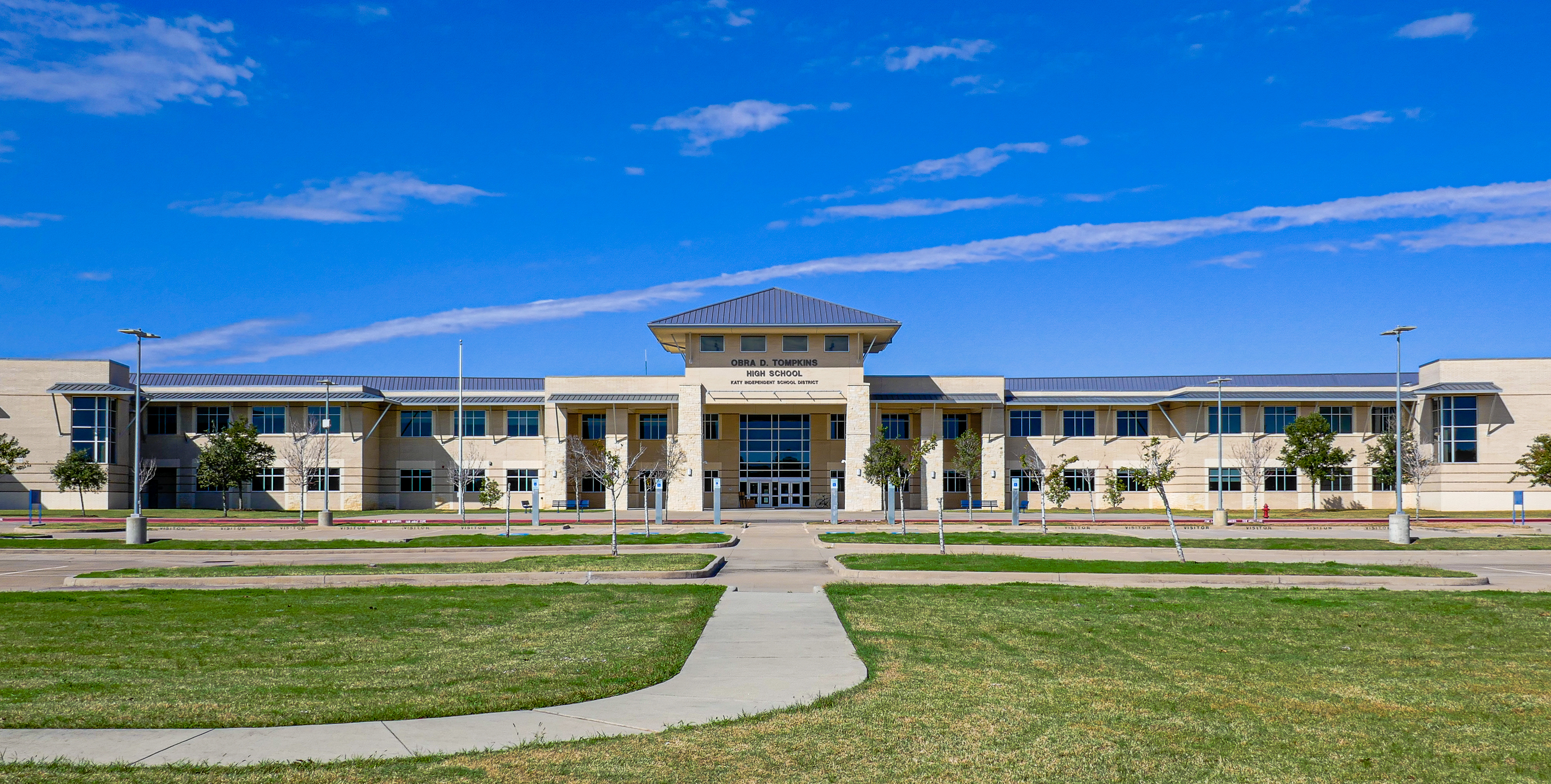

Location
- 4400 Falcon Landing Boulevard; Katy, Fort Bend County, Texas 77494; United States; 29.7329297°N 95.81420700000001°W

Information
- Type: Public high school
- Motto: It's a great day to be a falcon
- Established: 2013
- School district: Katy Independent School District
- CEEB code: 443726
- Principal: Elisabeth Brodt
- Staff: 183.08 (FTE)
- Faculty: 229
- Grades: 9-12
- Enrollment: 3,155 (2024-2025)
- Student to teacher ratio: 17.23
- Campus type: Suburban
- Colors: Crimson; White; Navy
- Athletics conference: UIL Class 6A
- Mascot: Falcons
- Website: www.katyisd.org/OTHS

Obra D. Tompkins High School (OTHS) is a high school located in unincorporated Fort Bend County, Texas in Greater Katy, within Greater Houston. The school is part of the Katy Independent School District.

Tompkins was created to relieve the overflow of students in the neighboring Seven Lakes High School which had almost 4,000 students during the 2012–2013 school year. In August 2013, Tompkins opened with only freshman and sophomore classes but had students in grades 9-12 beginning in August 2015.

The school is named for Obra D. Tompkins, a long-serving educator in the Katy school district. It is located off Falcon Landing Blvd. and Gaston Road at the edge of the Cinco Ranch Line. However, as Tompkins experienced an influx of students, the new Jordan High School (Fulshear, Texas) was created to alleviate the growing number of students.

== Campus ==
Tompkins is a 610,000 square feet (57,000 m^{2}) facility on a 98-acre (40 ha) plot and has a design almost exactly like that of Seven Lakes. The Tompkins campus may house around 4,000 students. Gilbane Building Co. built the school while PBK Architects designed the school.

== Feeder patterns ==
The following elementary schools feed into O.D. Tompkins High School:

- Davidson Elementary
- Jenks Elementary (partial)
- Shafer Elementary (partial)
- Wilson Elementary (partial)
- WoodCreek Elementary (partial)
- Kilpatrick Elementary (partial)
- Rylander Elementary (partial)

The following junior high schools feed into O.D. Tompkins High School:

- WoodCreek Junior High (partial)
- Tays Junior High
- Cinco Ranch Junior High (partial)

== Notable alumni ==
- Bárbara Olivieri – professional soccer player for the Tigres UANL and Venezuelan women's national team
- Jalen Milroe - NFL football quarterback for the Seattle Seahawks
- Jace LaViolette - Outfielder for the Cleveland Guardians
