= Nottingham Country, Texas =

Community in Texas, US

Nottingham Country is a master-planned community developed during the 1970s and 1980s in multiple phases by the Kickerillo Companies in Harris County, Texas, lying in unincorporated Harris County between the cities of Katy and Houston. As of 2014 there were 2,400 residences.

Nottingham Country was built in the 1970s and 1980s. It is bordered by Interstate 10 at the north, Westgreen Boulevard to the west, Fry Road to the east, and Highland Knolls Drive to the south. The neighborhood is divided into 10 sections, with section 1 being the oldest. Although it does not fall within the city of Katy, the entire neighborhood lies within the Katy post office's jurisdiction (zip 77450) and is served by the Katy Independent School District.

The Nottingham Country Community Improvement Association (NCCIA) covers all sections except 10. The Nottingham Country Fund Inc. serves Section 10.

== History ==
The subdivision was built on a prairie, then without trees, beginning in the mid-1970s and throughout the 1980s.

In 2006 Harris County enacted a flood control program that involved dredging sediment from Mason Creek to avoid street flooding in Nottingham Country.

By 2015 area residents started the keepkidsalivedrive25 campaign to lower speed limits from 30 to 25 in Nottingham Country.

== Schools ==
Nottingham Country is served by Katy Independent School District. In 2007 Betty L. Martin of the Houston Chronicle stated that the schools attracted prospective homebuyers. Nottingham Country Elementary and James E. Taylor High School are in the community.

Elementary:

- Nottingham Country Elementary
- Hazel S. Pattison Elementary

Junior High:

- Garland McMeans Junior High
- Memorial Parkway Junior High

Senior High:

- James E. Taylor High School
