= Morton Ranch High School =

Public school in Texas, United States

Coordinates: 29.80313°N 95.745019°W

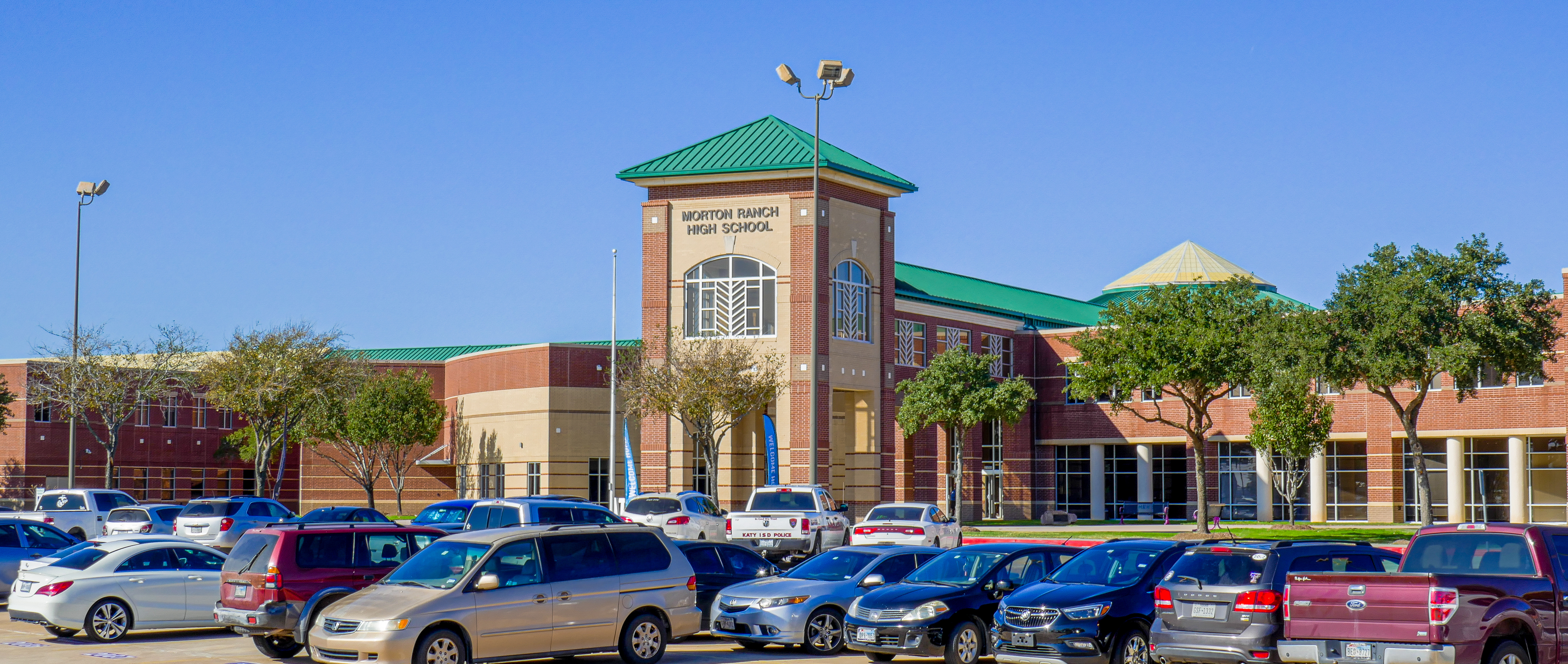

Location
- 21000 Franz Road; Katy, Texas 77449; United States

Information
- Type: Free public
- Motto: "Be purple, be proud, it's the MAVERICK way."
- Established: 2004
- School district: Katy Independent School District
- Principal: Julie Hinson
- Teaching staff: 200.17 (FTE)
- Grades: 9-12
- Enrollment: 2,832 (2023-2024)
- Student to teacher ratio: 14.15
- Campus size: 112 acres (0.45 km^{2})
- Campus type: Suburban
- Colors: Purple and white
- Athletics conference: UIL Class 6A
- Mascot: Maverick
- Website: www.katyisd.org/MRHS

Morton Ranch High School is a secondary school in the Katy Independent School District. It opened in 2004, and is located in unincorporated Harris County, Texas, United States. It is part of a multi-school complex, including Morton Ranch Elementary that opened in 2008 and Morton Ranch Junior High School that opened in 2003. The school serves many northern sections of Katy I.S.D., and has grades 9 through 12. The mascot is a Maverick.

== History ==
In 2012, the nonprofit Children at Risk categorized Morton Ranch as an "urban school" for the first time, since the school had a low income population exceeding 50%. That year, it ranked Morton Ranch as the best "urban" comprehensive high school in the Houston area.

== Demographics ==
In 2012 there were 3,050 students. 36% of the students were Hispanic or Latino, 39% were white, 18% were black, and 5% were Asian.

== Academic performance ==
The school's passing rate for the Texas Assessment of Knowledge and Skills (TAKS) language arts test for 11th graders was 98% as of 2012. The Class of 2010 four year graduation rate was 90%.

== Campus ==
Morton Ranch High School is a modified repeat design based on the award-winning Cinco Ranch High School plan. The major differences between Morton Ranch High School and Cinco Ranch High School are in the size of the science labs, the weight room, and the addition of a third gym at the east end of the building.

Specific detail changes requested by the end users have been incorporated to make a great plan even better. Also, the exterior of the building was changed to give it a different character. Morton Ranch also has a large library, located off the rotunda in the west wing of the school. Morton Ranch High School includes a Performing Arts Center that was master-planned during the original construction.

=== Additions ===
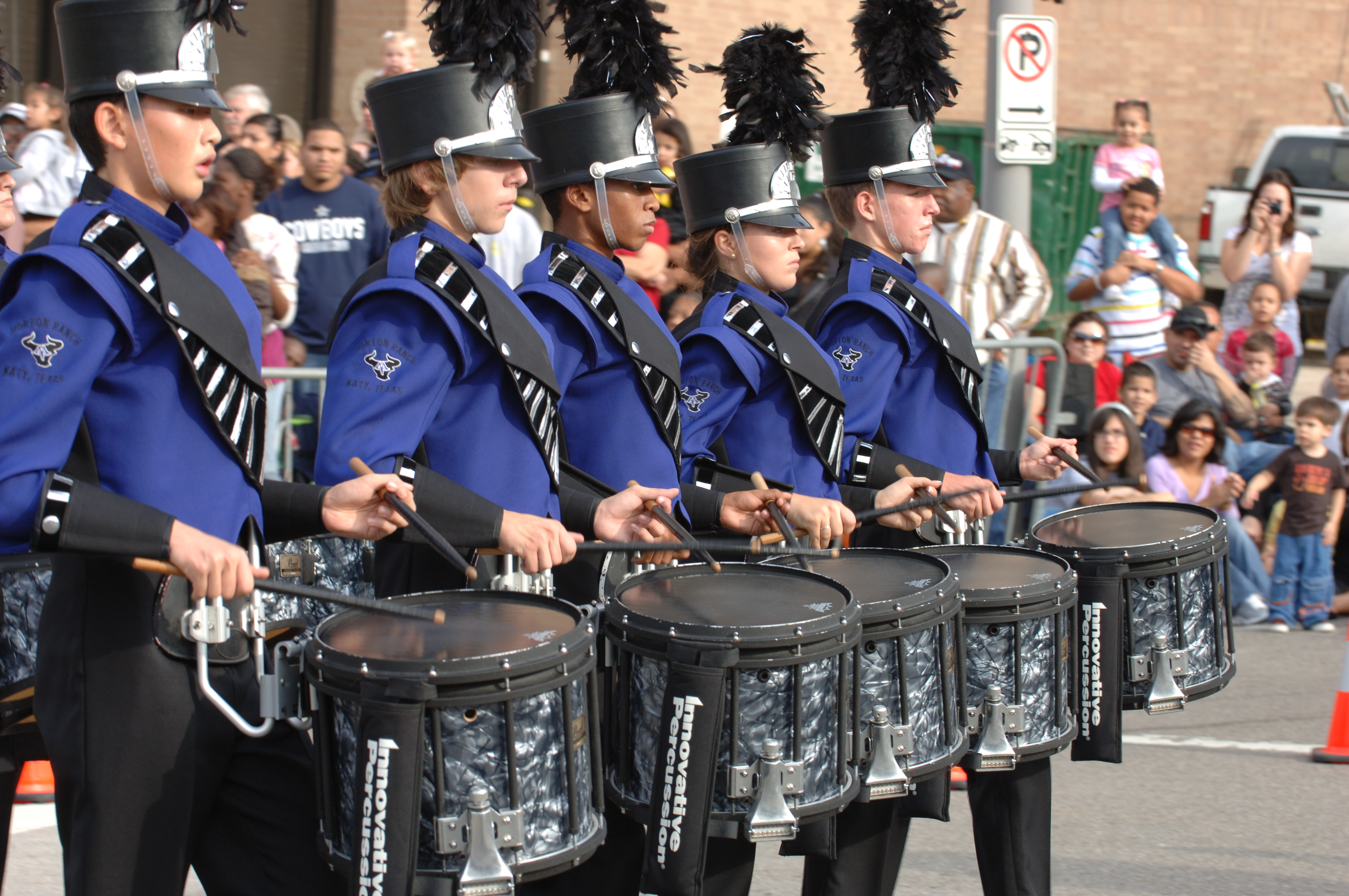
The band's drumline in November 2008

For the growth that outdid Katy Independent School District predictions, a new bond was passed. The bond included a new Ninth Grade Center for Morton Ranch High School, that was completed for the 2008–2009 school year.

Originally, the 9th Grade Center at Morton Ranch High School was scheduled to be complete in time for the 2007–2008 school year, but a failed bond pushed the project back one year.

== Athletics ==
Since the 2006–2007 school year, Morton Ranch High School has been entered as a school. It now plays several 6A Varsity sports including:

- Basketball
- Tennis
- Football
- Golf
- Soccer
- Wrestling
- Baseball
- Softball
- Volleyball
- Track and Field
- Cross Country
- Swimming
- Bowling

== Feeder patterns ==
The following elementary schools feed into Morton Ranch High School:

- Franz Elementary
- Golbow Elementary
- Sundown Elementary
- Winborn Elementary
- King Elementary (partial)
- McRoberts Elementary (partial)
- Stephens Elementary (partial)
- Morton Ranch Elementary (partial)

The following junior high schools feed into Morton Ranch High School:

- Katy Junior High (partial)
- McDonald Junior High (partial)
- Morton Ranch Junior High

== Notable alumni ==
- Kevin Foster (2008) – basketball player who played overseas
- Tamyra Mensah-Stock (2011) - WWE pro wrestler and Olympic Gold medalist in freestyle wrestling
- Danielle Hunter (2012) - NFL All-Pro defensive end
- Elijah Hall (2013) - track and field athlete
- LJ Cryer (2020) - NBA G League basketball player
