= Instructure =

American technology company

Instructure Holdings, Inc.
- Type: Private
- Industry: Educational Technology; Learning Management Systems; Assessment Management Systems; Assessment
- Founded: 2008; 18 years ago
- Founder: Brian Whitmer and Devlin Daley
- Headquarters: Cottonwood Heights, Utah, United States
- Number of locations: 7
- Area served: Worldwide
- Key people: Steve Daly; (CEO)
- Products: Canvas; Catalog; Studio; Portfolium; MasteryConnect; Videri; CASE Benchmarks and Item Bank; Navigate Item Bank; Academic Benchmarks; Certify; DataConnect; Program Assessment; Pathways; Canvas for Corporate Education
- Revenue: $530.2 million (2023)
- Owner: KKR; Dragoneer
- Number of employees: 1,466 (2022)
- Website: instructure.com

Canvas
- The software's logo
- Developer: Instructure
- Written in: Ruby on Rails
- License: Core AGPLv3; Some official plugins proprietary
- Website: instructure.com/canvas
- Repository: github.com/instructure/canvas-lms

Instructure Holdings, Inc. is an educational technology company based in Cottonwood Heights, Utah, United States. It is the developer and publisher of Canvas, a web-based learning management system.

== History ==
The company was founded in 2008 by two BYU graduate students, Brian Whitmer and Devlin Daley. Its initial funding came from Mozy founder Josh Coates, who served as Instructure's CEO from 2010 to 2018 and chairman of the board through 2020.

In December 2010, the Utah Education Network (UEN), a representative of some Utah colleges and universities, announced that Instructure would be replacing Blackboard. By 2013, the company's customer base had increased to at least 9 million users.

In 2011, Instructure launched Canvas, a learning management system. The company announced that Canvas would be made freely available under an Affero General Public License (AGPL) license as open-source software. However, the company continued to sell Canvas management as a service. Canvas became available on iOS in 2011, and on Android in 2013.

In 2015, Instructure launched Bridge, a cloud-based corporate learning management system. It was acquired by Learning Technologies Group (LTG) in 2021.

As of 2015, the company had raised $90 million in funding from investors. On November 13, 2015, the firm began trading as a publicly held company on the New York Stock Exchange.

In 2017, the company acquired Philadelphia-based video learning startup Practice XYZ, formerly known as ApprenNet, and merged the offerings into its own products.

In 2020, Thoma Bravo acquired the company for $2 billion. As of 2020, Canvas was used in approximately 4,000 institutions worldwide. In June 2021, Instructure again filed for an IPO, and began trading under the symbol INST.

In 2024, it was announced that KKR and Dragoneer had completed their $4.8 billion purchase of the company.

Later in 2024, Instructure announced the acquisition of Parchment, a credential management platform.

=== 2026 Canvas security breach ===
In late April 2026, Canvas LMS experienced a security breach, with an outage following in early May.The hack is considered the largest educational security breach on record due to its unprecedented global scale, affecting 8,809 universities, educational ministries, and other institutions worldwide. Instructure disclosed that it was investigating a cybersecurity attack involving certain user data, including names, email addresses, student ID numbers, and messages amongst users. The company claimed it had found no evidence that passwords, birth dates, government IDs, or financial information were involved in the hacking. However, other sources indicate that this cybersecurity attack has put 275 million students' and teachers' data at risk.

Despite Instructure's claim that the situation had been resolved, on May 7th, Canvas was hacked again; its login page was replaced with a ransomware message by ShinyHunters, the criminal hacking group that claimed responsibility. ShinyHunters threatened to release Canvas's sensitive data unless its ransom was paid by the end of May 12.

404 Media stated this was the largest educational security breach ever on record. ShinyHunters claimed to have stolen 3.65 terabytes of data (approximately 275 million records).

By May 8, seven lawsuits in federal courts had been filed against Instructure, including one that also named KKR as a defendant. On May 13, a California-specific proposed class action lawsuit was filed by a San Diego resident against Instructure in the Southern District of California, alleging the breach of personally identifiable information.

== See also ==
- History of virtual learning environments
- Virtual learning environment
