= Katy High School =

Public school in Texas, United States

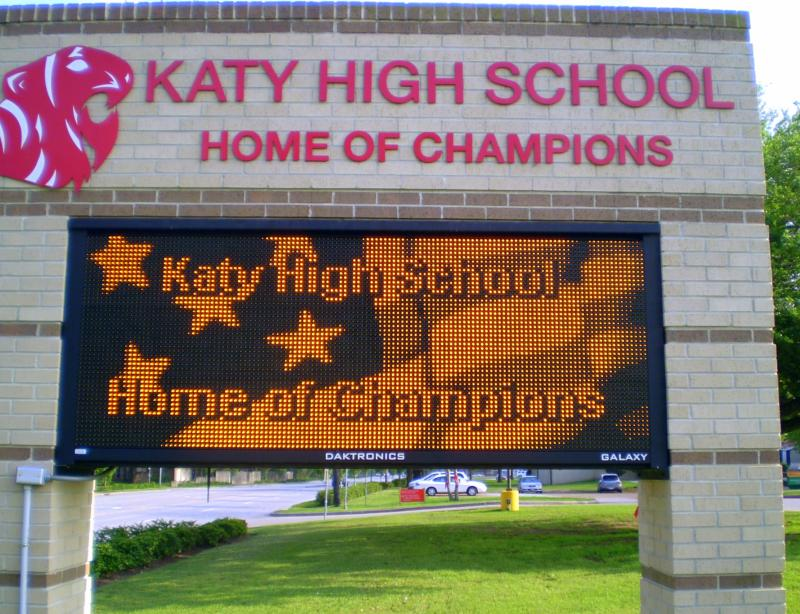

Location
- 6331 Highway Boulevard; Katy, Texas 77494; United States; 29°47′05″N 95°49′56″W

Information
- Type: Public high school
- Motto: Home of Champions
- Established: 1898
- School district: Katy Independent School District
- NCES District ID: 4825170
- Educational authority: Texas Education Agency
- Superintendent: Ken Gregorski
- CEEB code: 443735
- NCES School ID: 482517002809
- Principal: Rick Hull
- Faculty: 278
- Teaching staff: 216.94 (FTE)
- Grades: 9th–12th
- Gender: Co-educational
- Enrollment: 3,543 (2024-2025)
  - Grade 9: 938
  - Grade 10: 888
  - Grade 11: 917
  - Grade 12: 800
- Student to teacher ratio: 15.37
- Campus size: 100 acres (0.40 km^{2})
- Campus type: Suburban
- Colors: Red; White
- Athletics: Yes
- Athletics conference: UIL Class 6A
- Mascot: Tiger
- Website: khs.katyisd.org

Katy High School is a high school located in Katy, Texas which serves grades 9 through 12. It is a part of the Katy Independent School District. The school serves the City of Katy and draws students from Harris County, Waller County, and Fort Bend County.

== History ==
Katy High School opened in 1898 to serve the children of local rice farmers. Its first graduating class was in 1900.

== Athletics ==
Softball state champions (3)

- 6A: 2015, 2019
- 6A D2: 2026

Football state champions (9)

- 1A: 1959
- 5A D1: 1997
- 5A D2: 2000, 2003, 2007, 2008, 2012
- 6A D2: 2015, 2020

== Feeder Patterns ==
The following elementary schools feed into Katy High School:

- Bryant Elementary School
- Hutsell Elementary School
- Katy Elementary School
- Faldyn Elementary School (partial)
- King Elementary School (partial)
- Robertson Elementary School (partial)
- West Memorial Elementary School (partial)
- Wolman Elementary School (partial)
- Woodcreek Elementary School (partial)

The following junior high schools feed into Katy High School:

- Haskett Junior High School (partial)
- Katy Junior High School (partial)
- West Memorial Junior High School (partial)
- Woodcreek Junior High School (partial)

== Notable alumni ==
- Nic Anderson (2022) – college football wide receiver for the Kentucky Wildcats
- Rodney Anderson (2015) – NFL running back
- Ryder Anderson (2017) – NFL defensive end for the New York Giants
- Clint Black – country singer
- Davis Cleveland – actor
- Andy Dalton (2006) – NFL quarterback for the Carolina Panthers
- Joel Dehlin – former Chief Information Officer for the LDS Church
- John Dehlin – Mormon podcaster
- Jorge Diaz (1992) – NFL offensive tackle for the Tampa Bay Buccaneers and the Dallas Cowboys.
- Paddy Fisher (2016) – all-state LB and college football player at Northwestern and former AFL LB for the Michigan Panthers
- Terrence Frederick (2008) – NFL defensive back for the New Orleans Saints
- Johnathan Hall (2023) – college football linebacker for the Utah Utes
- Eric Heitmann (1998) – 10-year starting NFL center for the San Francisco 49ers
- Dalton Johnson (2021) – college football safety for the Arizona Wildcats
- Bo Levi Mitchell (2008) – CFL quarterback for the Hamilton Tiger-Cats
- Ryan Mouton – NFL cornerback (2009-2013)
- Sage Northcutt – Professional MMA Fighter. Currently fights in ONE Championship.
- Moro Ojomo (2018) – NFL Defensive Tackle for the Philadelphia Eagles
- Pamela Ribon – screenwriter, novelist, and actress
- Mike Swick – retired professional Mixed Martial Artist, competed on the inaugural season of The Ultimate Fighter
- Keith Whittington- Class of 1986. William Nelson Cromwell Professor of Politics at Princeton University.
- Renée Zellweger – actress
