= Katy Independent School District =

School district in Texas, United States

Coordinates: 29.7795°N 95.8328°W

Katy Independent School District Or KISD
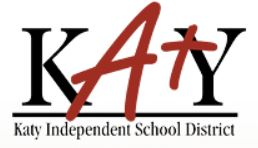

Address
- 6301 South Stadium Lane Katy, Texas, 77494; United States

District information
- Type: Public
- Motto: Community of Excellence
- Grades: Pre-K – 12
- Established: February 25, 1919
- Superintendent: Kenneth Gregorski
- Schools: 78
- Budget: US$1.108 billion (2021-22)
- NCES District ID: 4825170

Students and staff
- Students: 94,785 (2023–2024)
- Teachers: 6,761.96 (on an FTE basis) (2023–2024)
- Staff: 6,207.14 (on an FTE basis) (2023–2024)
- Student–teacher ratio: 14.02 (2023–2024)

Other information
- Website: Official Website

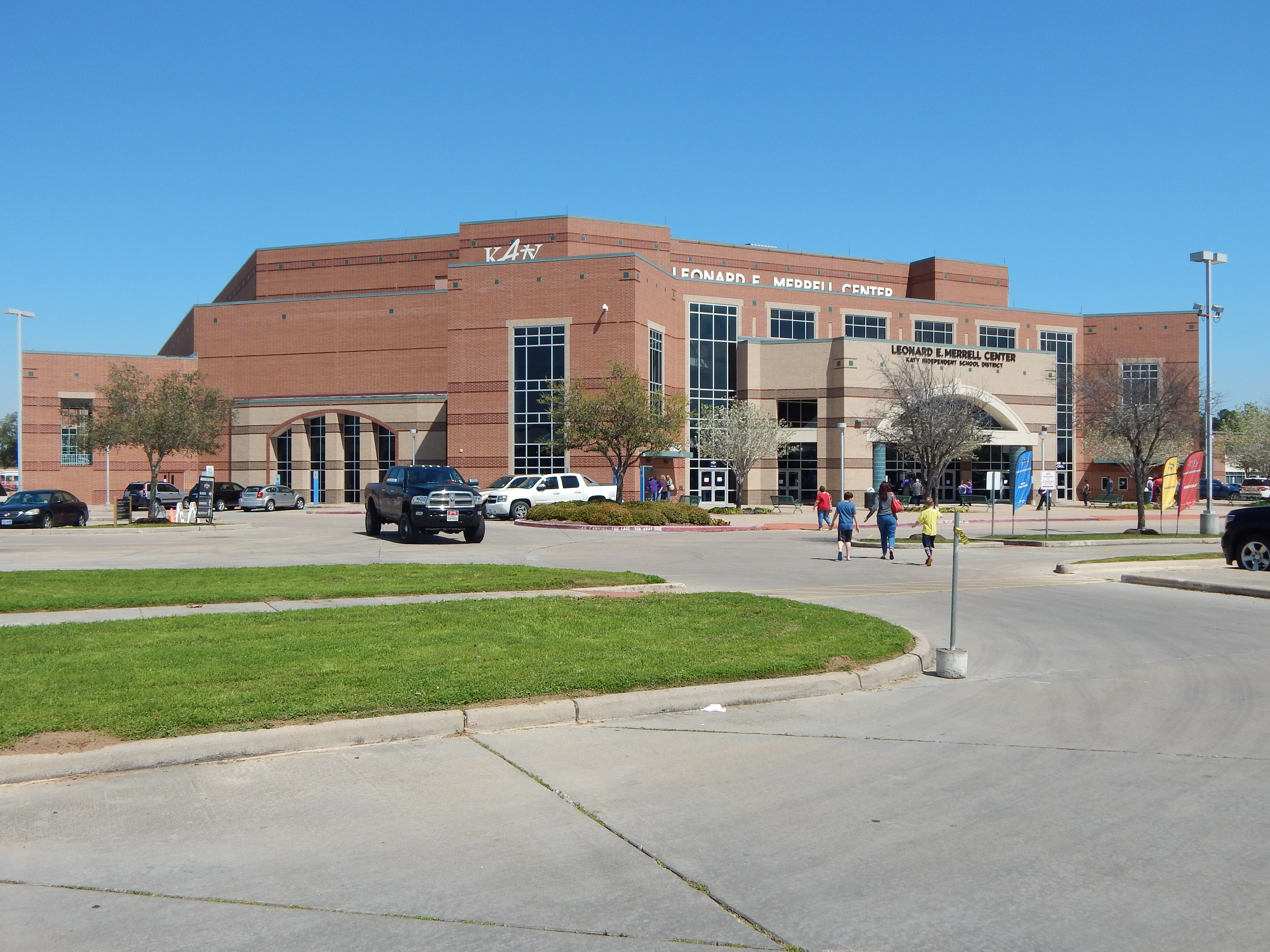
Leonard E. Merrell Center

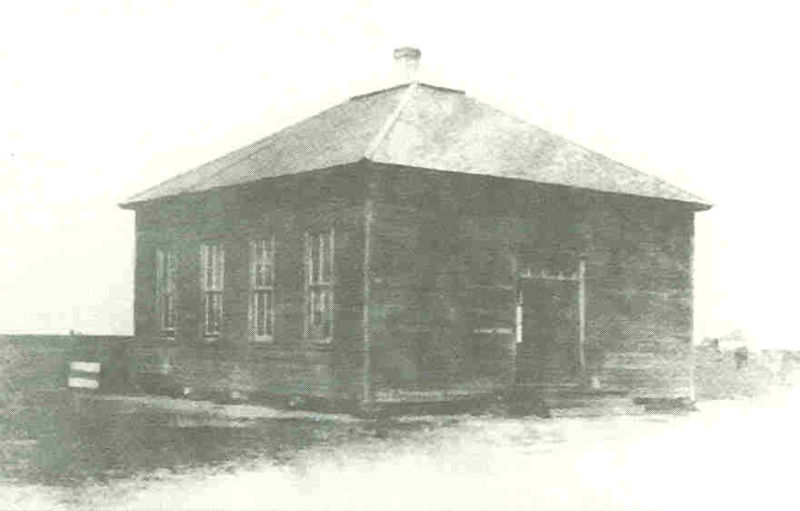
Katy School 1899-1909 Elementary School 1909-1927

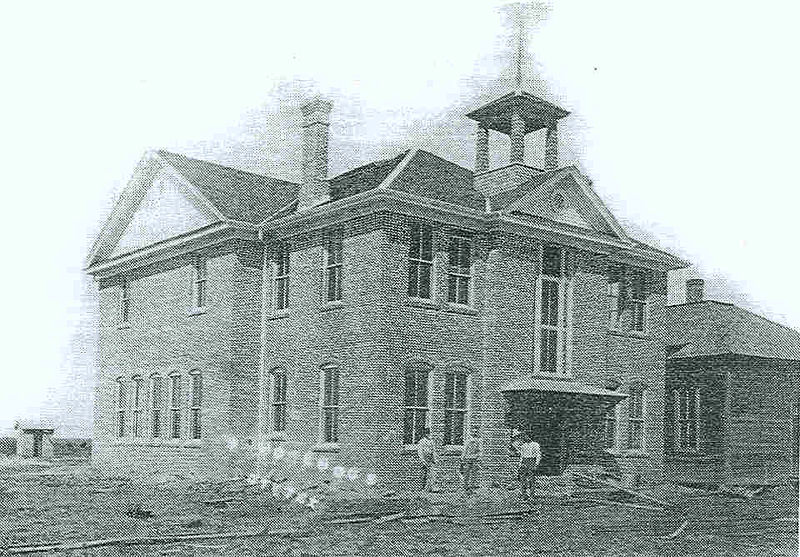
Katy High School building 1909-1947

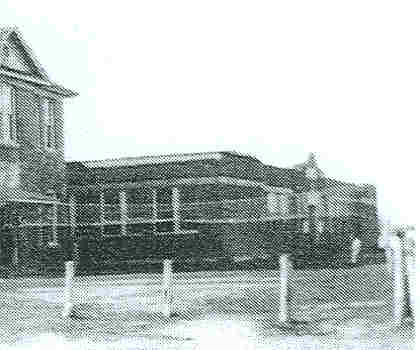
Elementary School addition 1927-1951

The Katy Independent School District (KISD) is a public school district based in Katy, Texas, United States, with an enrollment of over 85,700 students. In 2022, the district was given a grade of "A" by the Texas Education Agency.

The district serves 181 square miles (469 km^{2}) in parts of Harris County, Fort Bend County and Waller County. Most of the district lies within the boundaries of the City of Houston, the City of Katy or their municipalities' extraterritorial jurisdiction (ETJ). Unincorporated areas in Katy ISD include Barker, Cinco Ranch, and Cimarron.

All residential areas of the district are assigned to an elementary school, a junior high school, and a high school by subdivision.

== History ==
=== From Katy CSD to Katy ISD (1898–1919) ===
In 1898, the Katy Common School District (Katy CSD) was formed and the city built a 32 square foot, one-room school for all grade levels on 6th Street (now called George Bush Drive), where Katy Elementary is today. Winds from the catastrophic 1900 Galveston hurricane blew across the open prairie as far as Katy and destroyed the school building. The city rebuilt the school, and several other schools were built in quick succession in all three of Katy's counties.

In 1909 a new Katy CSD building was built next to the original one-room school on 6th Street. This was called Katy School, and it was a two-story building with a bell tower to call the students to class each morning. High school students attended classes in the new building, while elementary students continued to study in the smaller one. The bell is now above the entrance of Katy Elementary.

In 1918–1919, Katy's residents voted to separate the school from municipal control (called "divorcement") and to consolidate Katy CSD and other nearby schools within Katy's three counties into an independent school district (that is, a special-purpose district that is independent from local government control).

=== Covid (2020) ===
In March 2020, classes, campus events, field trips, student trips and competitions were postponed as a result of the COVID-19 pandemic in Texas. Virtual learning was put in place using Canvas, and was extended throughout the 2020–2021 school year during which two options were offered for returning students. The first involved in-person instruction, combining face-to-face teaching with digital learning through Canvas, including daily attendance tracking. The second option, the Katy Virtual Academy (KVA), offered real-time, live instruction via Canvas, allowing students to follow the KISD curriculum and meet Texas graduation requirements. Both in-person and virtual students adhered to the same grading guidelines, but the attendance requirement for the fall 2020 final exam eligibility was waived, allowing high school students to exempt a final exam if they met semester average and behavior requirements.

In adherence to safety measures, facial coverings were mandated for all district staff and students in grades 4 through 12, while students in pre-k through grade 3 were encouraged to wear face coverings. The protocol also included instructional day temperature checks for new district enrollees and late arrival students.

== Academics ==
For students who started ninth grade in 2019–2020, 94.9% graduated within four years.

For students in grades 9–12 during the 2022–2023 school year, 0.7% dropped out.

During the 2022–2023 school year, 12.4% were chronically absent (absent at least 10% of the school year).

During the 2022–2023 school year, 36.1% of students in grades 11 and 12 took at least one Advanced Placement or International Baccalaureate exam, and of those 83.1% received a passing score.

The average SAT score for students graduating in 2022–2003 was 1087, and the average ACT score was 25.3.

== Staff ==
1% of the staff hold a doctorate; 26.6% hold a master's degree; 72.1% hold a bachelor's degree; and 0.3% have no degree. On average, teachers have 10.9 years experience.

For the 2023–2024 school year, there was on average 14 students for each teacher.

== District awards ==
The United States Department of Education's National Blue Ribbon Schools Program recognizes exemplary schools. These Katy ISD schools have been awarded this honor:

- Elementary schools:
  - Edna Mae Fielder Elementary (1999)
  - Zelma Hutsell Elementary (2001)
  - Katy Elementary (2006)
  - Memorial Parkway Elementary (1999)
  - Hazel S. Pattison Elementary (1994)
  - Diane Winborn Elementary (2012)
- Junior high schools:
  - Rodger and Ellen Beck Junior High (2002)
  - Memorial Parkway Junior High (2000)
- High schools:
  - Cinco Ranch High (2008)
  - Seven Lakes High (2008)
  - Katy High (1998)
  - James E. Taylor High (1996)

== Demographics ==
Katy ISD has over 100,000 students.

The Katy Independent School District (Katy ISD) A+ Pay 'N' Go is an online payment system that provides a way for parents, students, and other community members to make payments for various school-related fees and services. It is an online web store that simplifies transactions for a range of district services.

Features and Functionality Katy ISD's A+ Pay 'N' Go system is designed to provide a convenient and secure way to handle school finances without the need for cash or checks. The platform accepts credit cards and e-checks, and notably, it does not charge transaction fees.

Race and ethnicity: 36.5% Hispanic, 26.8% White, 14.5% Black, 17.2% Asian. In 2016, it was reported that 34.4% of the students were Hispanic because Katy has a sizeable Colombian, Mexican, and Venezuelan population.

Risk factors: 44.3% at-risk of dropping out of school, 44% economically disadvantaged, 25.6% limited English proficiency

Program enrollment: 25% bilingual/ESL, 16.2% special education, 8.9% gifted and talented

== Schools ==
=== High schools ===
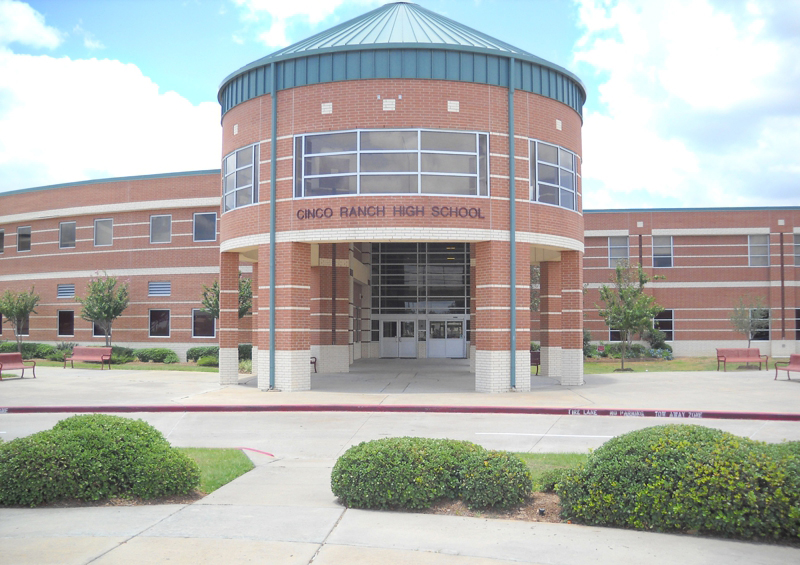
Cinco Ranch High School

High School	Location	Year Established
Cinco Ranch High School	Unincorporated Fort Bend County	1999
Freeman High School	Unincorporated Harris County	2024
Jordan High School	Fulshear	2020
Katy High School	Katy	1947
Mayde Creek High School	Unincorporated Harris County	1984
Morton Ranch High School	Unincorporated Harris County	2004
Patricia E. Paetow High School	Unincorporated Harris County	2017
Seven Lakes High School	Unincorporated Fort Bend County	2005
James E. Taylor High School	Unincorporated Harris County	1979
Obra D. Tompkins High School	Unincorporated Fort Bend County	2013

In addition, the Katy ISD website lists under high schools:

- Miller Career & Technology Center: Offers students from other campuses specialized career and technology programs as well as core classes.
- Opportunity Awareness Center: The discipline alternative campus for the school district.
- Martha Raines Academy: A project-based learning campus that allows students to earn credits at an accelerated pace.

=== Junior high schools ===
Junior High School	Location	Year Established
Joe M. Adams Junior High	Fulshear	2019
Rodger & Ellen Beck Junior High	Unincorporated Fort Bend County	1995
Beckendorff Junior High	Unincorporated Fort Bend County	2004
Cardiff Junior High	Unincorporated Harris County	2008
Cinco Ranch Junior High	Unincorporated Fort Bend County	2001
Bill & Cindy Haskett Junior High	Unincorporated Harris County	2021
Katy Junior High	Katy	1965 (former location); 1995 (present location)
Mayde Creek Junior High	Unincorporated Harris County	1980
T. H. McDonald Junior High	Unincorporated Harris County	1991
Garland McMeans Junior High	Unincorporated Harris County	2000
Memorial Parkway Junior High	Unincorporated Harris County	1982
Morton Ranch Junior High	Unincorporated Harris County	2003
Nelson Junior High	Unincorporated Harris County	2024
Seven Lakes Junior High	Unincorporated Fort Bend County	2012
Stockdick Junior High	Unincorporated Harris County	2017
James & Sharon Tays Junior High	Unincorporated Fort Bend County	2016
West Memorial Junior High	Unincorporated Harris County	1976
WoodCreek Junior High	Katy	2008

=== Elementary schools ===
Elementary School	Location	Year Established
Roosevelt Alexander Elementary	Unincorporated Fort Bend County	1998
Bear Creek Elementary	Unincorporated Harris County	1978
Catherine Bethke Elementary	Unincorporated Harris County	2016
Alfred & Ann Boudny Elementary	Unincorporated Harris County	2025
Robert & Felice Bryant Elementary	Unincorporated Waller County	2017
Amy Campbell Elementary	Fulshear	2018
Cimarron Elementary	Unincorporated Harris County	1980
Betty Sue Creech Elementary	Unincorporated Fort Bend County	2000
James & Mitzi Cross	Unincorporated Waller County	2025
Keiko Davidson Elementary	Unincorporated Fort Bend County	2014
Jo Ella Exley Elementary	Unincorporated Fort Bend County	2004
Russell & Cindie Faldyn Elementary	Katy	2023
Edna Mae Fielder Elementary	Unincorporated Fort Bend County	1993
Franz Elementary	Unincorporated Harris County	2004
Loraine T. Golbow Elementary	Unincorporated Harris County	1989
Michael Griffin Elementary	Unincorporated Fort Bend County	2006
Jeanette Hayes Elementary	Unincorporated Harris County	1995
Bonnie Holland Elementary	Unincorporated Fort Bend County	2008
Zelma Hutsell Elementary	Katy	1978
MayDell Jenks Elementary	Unincorporated Fort Bend County	2016
Katy Elementary	Katy	1898, 1951 (former locations); 1965 (present location)
Odessa Kilpatrick Elementary	Unincorporated Fort Bend County	1953-1978 (former location); 2003 (present location)
Robert E. King Elementary	Unincorporated Harris County	2001
Olga Leonard Elementary	Unincorporated Harris County	2019
Mayde Creek Elementary	Unincorporated Harris County	1983
Peter McElwain Elementary	Unincorporated Harris County	2020
Polly Ann McRoberts Elementary	Unincorporated Harris County	1997
Memorial Parkway Elementary	Unincorporated Harris County	1978
Morton Ranch Elementary	Unincorporated Harris County	2008
Nottingham Country Elementary	Unincorporated Harris County	1981
Hazel S. Pattison Elementary	Unincorporated Harris County	1989
James E. Randolph Elementary	Fulshear	2014
Jack & Sharon Rhoads Elementary	Unincorporated Harris County	2004
Steve & Elaine Robertson Elementary	Katy	2022
Roberta Wright Rylander Elementary	Unincorporated Fort Bend County	2004
Jean & Betty Schmalz Elementary	Unincorporated Harris County	2001
Fred & Patti Shafer Elementary	Unincorporated Fort Bend County	2012
Stan C. & Patsy Stanley Elementary	Unincorporated Fort Bend County	2009
Ursula Stephens Elementary	Unincorporated Harris County	2007
Sundown Elementary	Unincorporated Harris County	1982
West Memorial Elementary	Unincorporated Harris County	1974
James E. Williams Elementary	Unincorporated Fort Bend County	2000
Tom Wilson Elementary	Unincorporated Fort Bend County	2012
Diane Winborn Elementary	Unincorporated Harris County	1981
Maurice L. Wolfe Elementary	Houston	1968
Ray & Jamie Wolman Elementary	Unincorporated Fort Bend County	2012
WoodCreek Elementary	Katy	2007
David & Terri Youngblood Elementary	Unincorporated Harris County	2023

=== Support facilities ===
- Administration Building
- Leonard E. Merrell Center
- Rhodes Stadium
- Transportation Center (East) (adjacent to Mayde Creek High School)
- Transportation Center (West) (adjacent to Katy Junior High School)
- Transportation Center (South) (adjacent to Rylander Elementary School)
- Gerald Young Agricultural Science Center
- L. D. Robinson Pavilion & Rodeo Arena
- Katy ISD Law Enforcement Center (adjacent to Morton Ranch High School)
- Katy ISD Storage Annex (Danover Street, former Kilpatrick Elementary)
- Legacy Stadium

=== Other campuses ===
- Katy ISD Virtual School
- Robert R. Shaw Center for STEAM
- Simon Youth Academy

Katy ISD maintains and updates District Growth and Facilities Planning Studies.

== Departments ==
The Katy ISD Police Department was created in 1989 because the district had jurisdictional issues and low response times from other police agencies.

== Controversies ==
During the 2004–2005 school year Katy ISD began a new and revolutionary program in the history of the district, with the use of random drug testing for all individuals involved in UIL competitive organizations, student leaders of any official school clubs, and anyone wishing to park on campus. This caused much controversy prior to its instatement. Many parents complained to the school district, citing the new policy as the violation of individual rights. The district responded to this by having every student who wished to participate in the said activities sign a waiver granting the school district to test them randomly. This matter had already been settled by the Supreme Court of the United States as constitutional before KISD chose to implement it. In 2019, Katy ISD celebrated 100 years since being founded.

In 2015, the two sections of the Thornwood subdivision served by KISD proposed being removed from KISD and placed in the Spring Branch Independent School District. The boards of both school districts denied the proposal.

=== Lance Hindt ===
Lance Hindt, who served as the district's superintendent from 2016 to 2018, was an alumnus of Katy Taylor High School.

During a school board meeting in March 2018, an individual named Greg Gay (also known as Greg Barrett) spoke during a public forum segment of the meeting, and accused Hindt of shoving his head in a urinal when they were both enrolled in a secondary school within the district, and said the incident drove him to the brink of suicide. Hindt denied Gay's allegations, claiming he will only be judged by God, despite being recorded giggling in reaction to Gay's testimony.

Following the incident, Alabama judge David Carpenter also accused Hindt of bullying during their secondary school years. While Carpenter said that he was not a victim of Hindt's bullying, he has witnessed "frightening, intense and near constant" bullying of weaker classmates by Hindt. Carpenter even labeled Hindt a "thug".

Prior to the incidents' surfacing, Hindt was noted to have taken very public stance against bullying.

At around the same time, a man named Sean Dolan ran Hindt's dissertation through a software, and discovered that it matched with another paper, leading to accusations of plagiarism. The University of Houston administration stated that it would investigate the matter.

After an 18-month investigation, the University of Houston removed Hindt's dissertation from their official website. In May 2018, Hindt announced his resignation and retirement effective January 1, 2019, saying that he cannot fulfill his duties as superintendent and that he had done "dumb things". The district agreed to pay $955,795 as severance, a payment which violated Texas Education Code Section 11.201 and resulted in a loss of $513,755 in funding.

To pursue any defamation claims on behalf of Hindt, the district hired the law firm Feldman and Feldman.

Hindt would later campaign for the KISD board members who had defended him and arranged his huge severance bonus.

The district has been criticized for its perceived inaction on Hindt's plagiarism allegations, which critics say runs afoul of the district's responsibility to provide an ethical education to its students. The district's decision to retain a law firm for possible defamation lawsuits was also criticized as possibly an act of bullying in and of itself by the district against its critics, or even an attempt by a taxpayer-funded entity to silence those who were thinking about criticizing a public official.

=== Intellectual censorship ===
In October 2021, author Jerry Craft was scheduled to speak to fourth and fifth graders about his graphic novels New Kid and Class Act. Parents in the district claimed the books taught critical race theory and started an online petition, prompting the district to cancel the author visit and remove the book from school libraries. Craft was later invited again for a visit to the district, and the books were reinstated in libraries with a restricted audience.

During a school board meeting in November 2021, Seven Lakes High School senior and student activist Cameron Samuels spoke during a public forum segment of the meeting to claim the district was blocking student internet access to the Trevor Project and other websites supporting the LGBTQ+ community. Students, including Samuels, started a petition soon after that garnered almost two thousand signatures within a few months and drew national attention to the district.

The district defended blocking access to the Trevor Project by claiming it violated the Children's Internet Protection Act with its chat features. In December 2021 and January 2022, following formal complaints by Samuels, the district unblocked the websites of four organizations supporting the LGBTQ+ community: the Montrose Center, the Human Rights Campaign, PFLAG, and GLSEN. The filter was eventually brought down after a complaint and letter delivered by the ACLU of Texas on behalf of Samuels.

In February 2022, NBC senior investigative reporter Mike Hixenbaugh and NBC correspondent Antonia Hylton published a report on books disappearing in record numbers from Texas schools, especially those in Katy ISD. The district's superintendent, Dr. Kenneth Gregorski, sent a parent communication to clarify the district's policy regarding removing books from schools, which includes various methods for parent input.

The Houston Chronicle reported in February 2022 that Samuels and other students planned to distribute challenged books to students during a "FReadom Week" initiative, including Maus by Art Spiegelman and Beloved by Toni Morrison. In response to the distribution of hundreds of books, the district initiated an internal review of Maus. Students and parents spoke against banning Maus during the public forum segment of the March 2022 board meeting, and the district announced its decision later that week to keep the book in middle school libraries.

The ACLU of Texas delivered a letter to school board members and the superintendent in April 2022 claiming that the district's book removals violated the First Amendment, the Texas Constitution, and the district's own policies.

After a district parent filed a criminal complaint against Mike Curato's Flamer in the Jordan High School library, district police temporarily removed the book for an investigation. The book had already been deemed appropriate for high schools by a book review committee in March, and the police concurred.

At the August 2022 board meeting, the board discussed the first read of a proposed EF local policy update. Ten students from the Cinco Ranch High School Gay-Straight Alliance, led by student Logan McLean, spoke in support of adding students to the reconsideration committees for instructional materials. The policy was passed at the next meeting without the inclusion of students or explicit inclusion of librarians in the committees. McLean had planned to hold a book distribution at the start of the 2022–2023 school year with the GSA club, but school administrators claimed that prior review was necessary and confiscated the books.

In 2024 the district banned 14 books, including "Wicked: The Life and Times of the Wicked Witch of the West".

=== Gender fluidity policy ===
In August 2023, the district's Board of Trustees introduced a new policy on “Parental Authority & Gender Fluidity Matters” with a specific emphasis on transgender identity. The proposal would require district personnel to “out” transgender students to parents. Moreover, the policy prohibited discussions about gender fluidity and required students to use restroom and locker room facilities that correspond with their sex assigned at birth.

With significant media attention in the week leading up to the board's vote, community members arrived at the meeting to see hundreds in line for overflow seating. More than 100 speakers signed up to address the board during the public input portion, ensuing more than four hours of testimony from community members. Near midnight, the board passed the policy with a 4–3 vote after turning down Trustee Rebecca Fox's motion to postpone the vote.

Returning to school the day after the policy was adopted, a teacher of student Kadence Carter refused to affirm his chosen pronouns and name, leading him to drop out of the school district. The Houston Landing later reported that, per the policy's parental notification provisions, the district outed 19 students. This number grew to 36 students by the end of the year.

The following three days after the policy was adopted, students protested after school outside the district administration building. While many students faced harassment and exclusionary school environments, after-school clubs like the Sexuality & Gender Alliance at Obra D. Tompkins High School and the Cinco Ranch Gender-Sexuality Alliance continued thriving.

The U.S. Department of Education opened a federal civil rights investigation on May 6, 2024, into the policy on the basis of “gender harassment” under Title IX. This investigation was prompted by a complaint filed by student advocacy group, Students Engaged in Advancing Texas in November 2023. The group, along with the ACLU of Texas and community-based nonprofits, has hosted numerous events, including a rally, film screening, and Know Your Rights training.

== See also ==
- List of school districts in Texas
- List of schools in Harris County, Texas
- Bill Callegari, KISD trustee from 1984 to 1988; member of the Texas House of Representatives from Katy, 2001–2015
