= Cinco Ranch High School =

Public school in Texas, United States

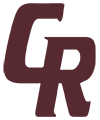

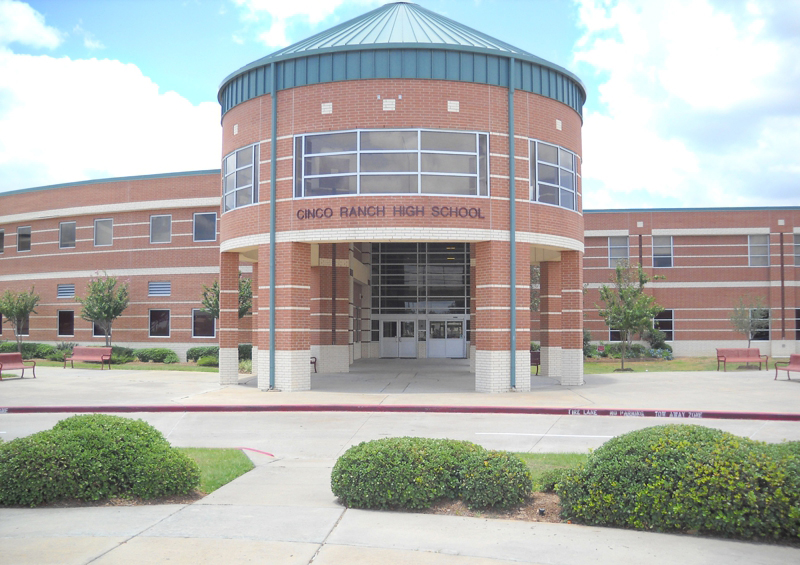

Location
- 23440 Cinco Ranch Boulevard; Katy, TX 77494; United States; 29°44′43″N 95°46′46″W

Information
- Type: Free public
- Established: 1999
- School district: Katy Independent School District
- Principal: Kaye Williams
- Faculty: 205
- Grades: 9-12
- Enrollment: 3,793 (2023-24)
- Student to teacher ratio: 17.77
- Campus size: 66 acres
- Campus type: Suburban
- Colors: Maroon and white
- Athletics conference: UIL Class 6A
- Mascot: Cougar
- Website: crhs.katyisd.org

Cinco Ranch High School (CRHS) is a public school located in an unincorporated area in Fort Bend County, Texas, United States that serves grades 9 through 12 as part of the Katy Independent School District. It is located off Cinco Ranch Boulevard within the community of Cinco Ranch; it is in the Cinco Ranch census-designated place. The school opened in 1999. The principal is Dr. Kaye Williams.

The school was rated the 3rd best high school in 2007 tied with Clements High School in the Houston region by the Houston Chronicle. In 2010, Cinco Ranch High School was ranked 478th out of America's top 2,000 public high schools.

The school was named a National Blue Ribbon School in 2008.

== History ==
Cinco Ranch High School opened in the fall of 1999 after a $143 million bond issue was passed in the spring of 1996 and another $324 million bond was passed in 1999 allowing for funding. In the initial years, the school played host to displaced students from other Katy ISD schools including 8th graders displaced by overcrowding at Beck Junior High School in the 1999-2000 school year. Other re-locations include students from West Memorial Elementary that moved to Cinco Ranch after the elementary encountered mold related issues in 2002.

The original building, built in 1999, has been expanded. It consists of a central rotunda, where the cafeteria, offices, and library are located. Attached to this are two long hallways running in opposite directions, which house classrooms. At the end of one of the hallways are the athletic facilities, including a natatorium, workout facility, gymnasiums, fields, and a stadium. At the end of the other hallway, on the opposite end of the school, are the fine arts rehearsal facilities, black box theatre, and the freshman center. The original facility was built on a 66-acre (270,000 m^{2}) site by PBK Architects to support a maximum of 2,800 students. The school has a net building area of 433,000 sq ft (40,200 m^{2}). and cost of $37,507,000.

The school benefited from the expanding budgets of KISD, which could be attributed to rapid growth in the surrounding areas and the addition of Katy Mills Mall, which, through taxes, gave a large boost to KISD funds. In 2001, many of the KISD high schools received renovations, and all received new performing arts centers (PACs). The KISD high schools also received additions of ninth grade centers, which may be attributed to the belief by the district that younger students benefit from an eased transition into high school. The PAC and 9th Grade Center were added to the fine arts end of the hallway at a cost of $11,356,050. The addition of the Performing Arts Center has improved the quality of both theatrical and musical productions. The department includes the orchestra, choir, band, visual arts, and theater productions.

The secondary expansion, along with 9th grade gyms and offices, made for a very long and narrow two-story building with a total length of one quarter mile. This "tunnel effect" creates an environment for indoor running in the summer. Another large athletic accoutrement, added in 2004, is a hill more than 30 feet (9.1 m) tall with a paved running track paved to facilitate track runner training.

== State championships ==
- 2004 Texas 5-A Boys' Track & Field State Champions
- 2005 Texas 5-A Boys' Track & Field State Champions
- 2006 Texas 5-A UIL Lincoln Douglas Debate Champion
- 2007 Texas 5-A UIL Lincoln Douglas Debate Champion
- 2007 Texas 5-A Wrestling State Champions
- 2010 Texas 5-A UIL News Writing Champion, also winning Tops of Texas
- 2016 Texas 6-A Women’s Wrestling State Champions
- 2020 Texas 6-A D1 UIL Spirit State Champions.

== Academics ==
In April 2007, Cinco Ranch was rated by the Houston Chronicle as the third best high school in the Houston area, preceded only by the High School for Performing and Visual Arts (HSPVA) and YES College Preparatory. Included in this ranking were TAKS scores, graduation rates, ACT, SAT, and AP testing rates and scores, class size, teacher experience, and percentage of students from poor families.

In 2008, Cinco Ranch was named a National Blue Ribbon School.

== Extracurricular activities ==
=== Athletics ===
In 2007, the Cinco Ranch Wrestling team won the University Interscholastic League Texas State Championships for high school wrestling.

=== Cheerleading ===
Cinco Ranch High School's cheer team won the Class 6A Div 1 UIL State Championship in 2020.

=== Debate ===
The Cinco Ranch Debate Team won the 5A UIL State Championship in Lincoln-Douglas Debate in both 2006 and 2007. Now, the team is centered around Public Forum.

=== Journalism ===
The 2001-2002 yearbook, Panorama, made news. When the yearbook publisher agreed to reprint the book with various corrections, school administrators asked that some essays be removed. These included an essay about a homosexual student “coming out”. A school administrator said that the yearbook was not an appropriate platform for the story. The yearbook was printed without the essay.

=== Robotics ===
CRyptonite Robotics, officially known as FIRST Robotics Competition Team 624, is a high school robotics team based in Katy, Texas, United States. The team operates out of Cinco Ranch High School and competes in the FIRST Robotics Competition (FRC) under the FIRST in Texas District.

==== Legacy ====
As of the 2025 season, CRyptonite has earned 19 blue banners, which are awarded for winning official FIRST events or receiving prestigious honors such as the Impact Award.

In the 2022 season, CRyptonite achieved a standout in performance, ranking top 10 in the world:

- Official Record: 54-12-1
- District Ranking: #4 in FIRST in Texas
- EPA (Estimated Power Rating): Ranked #10 globally

==== History ====
Founded in the early 2000s, Team 624 has built a reputation for technical excellence, community outreach, and consistent competitive performance. The team is known for its distinctive green branding and its commitment to STEM education through camps, demonstrations, and mentorship of younger robotics teams.

==== Outreach and Community Engagement ====
CRyptonite hosts annual science camps and STEM outreach events for elementary and middle school students across the Greater Houston area.

==== Competitive Record ====
As of the 2025 season, CRyptonite has participated in numerous regional, district, and championship-level events.

Season	Official Record	District Ranking	Playoff Performance
2025	38-28-0 (official), 42-35-0 (overall)	#12 in FIRST in Texas	Multiple playoff appearances, including Finals and Double Elimination rounds

The team has historically qualified for the FIRST Championship in Houston and has earned recognition for both robot performance and outreach efforts.

==== Team Identity ====
- Team Number: 624
- Team Name: CRyptonite
- Location: Katy, Texas, USA
- Affiliation: Cinco Ranch High School
- Website: frc624.org

== Feeder patterns ==
The following elementary schools feed into Cinco Ranch High School:

- Fielder Elementary School
- Williams Elementary School
- Creech Elementary School
- Exley Elementary School (partial)
- Griffin Elementary School (partial)
- Rylander Elementary School (partial)
- Cimarron Elementary School (partial)

The following junior high schools feed into Cinco Ranch High School:

- Beck Junior High School
- Cinco Ranch Junior High School (partial)
- West Memorial Junior High School (partial)

== Enrollment trends ==
After opening, Cinco Ranch High School steadily grew to over 3,600 students due to the rapid expansion of the Katy area. However, enrollment has decreased due to the opening of nearby Seven Lakes High School in 2005.

- 1999-2000 = 828
- 2000-2001 = 1,541
- 2001-2002 = 2,300
- 2002-2003 = 2,745
- 2003-2004 = 3,235
- 2004-2005 = 3,601
- 2005-2006 = 3,288
- 2006-2007 = 3,133
- 2007-2008 = 2,788
- 2008-2009 = 2,840
- 2009-2010 = 2,872
- 2010-2011 = 2,989
- 2011-2012 = 3,056
- 2012-2013 = 3,101
- 2013-2014 = 3,194
- 2014-2015 = 3,167
- 2023-2024 = 3,793

== Demographics ==
For the 2023-24 school year:

- Black: 9%
- Hispanic: 33%
- White: 38%
- Native American: 0.08%
- Asian: 14.5%
- Pacific Islander: 0.3%
- Two or More Races: 5%

== Newsweek ranking ==
Newsweek annually ranks the top 2,000 public high schools in the nation out of the approximately 27,000 that exist in the country. Cinco Ranch has made this list 9 times in the past 19 years.

- 2017 = 971th
- 2014 = 298th
- 2013 = 477th
- 2012 = 354th
- 2010 = 500th
- 2009 = 468th
- 2008 = 968th
- 2007 = 515th
- 2006 = 676th

== Notable alumni ==
- Spencer Arrighetti – American baseball player (born 2000)
- Stefan Crichton – American baseball player (born 1992)
- Louis Head – American baseball player (born 1990)
- Logan Henderson – American baseball player (born 2002)
- Brant Kuithe – American football tight end (born 1999)
- Ethan Onianwa – American football player (born 2003)
- Nic Wise – American professional basketball player (born 1987)
