= Grand Lakes =

Coordinates: 29°42′49″N 95°45′52″W

Grand Lakes, Texas is a 1,250-acre (510 ha) "master planned community" located in the extraterritorial jurisdiction of Houston within Fort Bend and Harris Counties in the U.S. state of Texas. It lies about 25 miles (40 km) west of Houston and 10 miles (16 km) north of Richmond. Grand Lakes is considered to be part of the Greater Katy area and is roughly 10 miles (16 km) southeast of the city of Katy and adjacent to Cinco Ranch and Seven Meadows.

== Schools in this area ==
Katy Independent School District

== Nearby Shopping ==
- Katy Mills
- LaCenterra at Cinco Ranch

== Churches ==
- Grand Lakes Presbyterian Church

== See also ==
- Grand Lakes Community Website
