= LaCenterra at Cinco Ranch =

- Location: Cinco Ranch near Katy, Texas, United States
- Coordinates: 29.742823°N 95.775645°W
- Address: 23501 Cinco Ranch Boulevard
- Opened: March 1, 2007 (19 years ago)
- Developer: Vista Properties and Amstar
- Owner: Brixmor Property Group
- Parking: 4 garages
- Website: www.lacenterra.com

LaCenterra at Cinco Ranch is an upscale 34-acre, 412,900 square foot open-air retail center, with 273,522 square feet of retail space and 139,378 square feet of office space. It is located at the Grand Parkway and Cinco Ranch Blvd, in Cinco Ranch, Texas, and includes stores, restaurants, and a public park that has frequent outdoor events, with the center hosting about 200 annual events.

It opened on March 1, 2007. PGIM Real Estate acquired it in 2017. In 2024, Trademark Property Company was retained to lease it, although it was reported to have a 96% occupancy rate at that time. In 2025, Brixmor Property Group bought the center for $223 million.

LaCenterra at Cinco Ranch has 5 million visits per year. Its store anchors include Trader Joe's and Alamo Drafthouse Cinema.
