= The MKT Depot =

The MKT Depot (Katy, Texas)
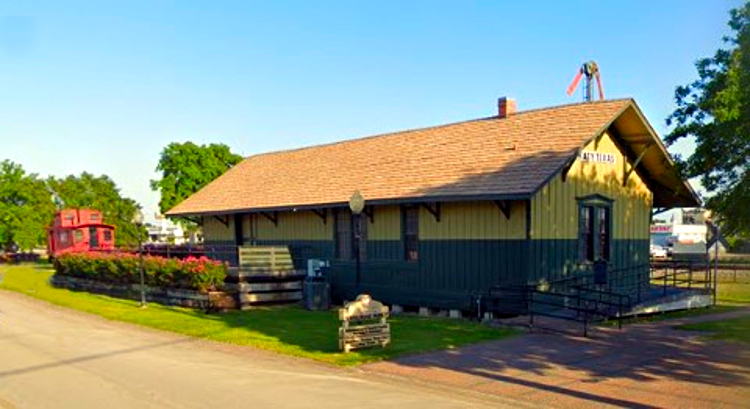
- The MKT Depot

General information
- Other names: MKT Railroad Museum
- Location: 5615 First Street; Katy, Texas 77493; United States
- Coordinates: 29.78630°N 95.82196°W
- Owner: City of Katy
- Operator: Katy Heritage Society
- Transit authority: Railroad Commission of Texas
- Line: Missouri Kansas Texas Railroad

Construction
- Structure type: at-grade
- Architectural style: American Foursquare

Other information
- Website: MKT Railroad Depot & Park

History
- Opened: 1 January 1894
- Opening: 1898
- Closed: 1 January 1957
Location

The MKT Depot or MKT Railroad Depot is a steam locomotive depot located in Katy, Texas. The Missouri–Kansas–Texas Railroad services commenced railway operations in 1894 and diminished the rail transport service by 1957 for the connection junction at Katy, Texas.

In 2005, the MKT Railroad Museum was relocated to the first street address in Katy, Texas.

== See also ==
- Gulf Coast Lines
- List of Texas railroads
