= Catt family =

Bank robbing family

Catt family of bank robbers
- Founding location: McMinnville, Oregon, United States
- Years active: 2010–2012
- Territory: Portland, Oregon, and Katy, Texas, areas
- Membership: Ronald Scott Catt; Hayden Catt; Abigail Catt
- Leader: Ronald Scott Catt
- Activities: Bank robberies

The Catt family, Ronald "Scott" Catt, and eventually his two children, Hayden and Abigail Catt, were responsible for a number of bank robberies in the Portland, Oregon and Houston, Texas areas. After the death of his wife, Catt was facing financial difficulties due in part to his drug and alcohol addictions and unstable employment history. Catt decided to bolster the family income by robbing banks. Catt and his family committed several robberies, all occurring while the family lived a seemingly typical middle-class American life.

== Family background ==
Ronald Scott Catt (born 1963, and known as "Scott") was an engineer married to "Beth" [nee Worrell] Catt. The couple had two children and lived in Dundee, Oregon, 45 miles outside Portland. After the 1997 death of his wife due to breast cancer, Scott Catt became addicted to drugs and alcohol. At the time of their mother's death, son Hayden was five and daughter Abby two years old. Friends afterward still saw Catt as a devoted single father to his children.

Hayden and Abby eventually attended McMinnville High School, where they were both honor students and members of the swimming team. Scott Catt was president of the McMinnville Swim Club board of directors and considered a well respected leader in the community. In 2011, Catt again lost his job and his house was foreclosed on. He connected with a corporate headhunter specializing in engineering, and relocated to Texas in January 2012. His children dropped out of school; Abby went to live with her grandmother, while Hayden moved to Hawaii to work at a resort.

Hayden and Abby, however, soon joined Scott in Texas. The family lived in the Nottingham Place apartment complex in a middle-class community of Katy, Texas, a western suburb of Houston. Around the complex, the Catts were considered "just everyday, harmless people." Catt held down a well-paying job as an engineer designing ore-moving systems for coke plants; Abby worked at the Victoria's Secret outlet at the Katy Mall; and Hayden attempted to get established as a concierge in a hotel.

"I did it for the family... I swear to you, I would only rob banks for my family." —Scott Catt

== Robberies ==
Sometime between 2000 and 2002, Catt began a series of as many as five Portland-area bank robberies—most without the knowledge of his children—which spanned a time-frame of several years. Catt has commented that it was an attempt to keep his family solvent while feeding his old addictions—to which a compulsion to rob banks with some regularity was now being added.

=== Portland, Oregon area ===
Because Catt's father had been a loan officer in a local bank, he had gained an insider's knowledge of day-to-day banking procedures. Catt remembered his father telling him as a boy of the day the local bank—at which he worked—was robbed. When Catt inquired why no one had tried to stop it, his father told him that the preferred employee response to a bank robbery is to comply with the robbers and give them any money requested (as the money was insured, and the bank would get back any monetary losses it suffered). The first bank Catt robbed was the very one at which his father had worked, just a couple of blocks from where he was living in McMinnville. The robbery went off with no trouble and netted him around $2,500. It was a year before Catt robbed another bank, and he continued, committing another bank robbery every year or so, as the need arose. These usually netted him $5,000–$10,000 per job.

In 2010, again behind on his bills, Catt planned to do another robbery. It was then he realized that with some additional help and the possibility of allowing him to get into the vault, he would be able to get more money during a bank robbery. Feeling unable to trust anyone except family, Catt asked his son to help him with what he referred to as his "part-time job". Hayden reluctantly agreed to join him, and at one point actually accompanied his father in casing a bank targeted by his father as the next to rob. On the day of the planned operation, however, he became too nervous to leave the apartment, so Scott simply robbed the bank himself, showing Hayden how easy it was.

=== Houston, Texas area ===
Starting fresh in Texas in 2012, Catt, now with the help of both his children, decided to embark on a crime spree, while the family kept up a facade of normality. The first robbery that Scott Catt perpetrated with the help of his family occurred at a Comerica Bank in Harris County on August 9, 2012. Scott and Hayden entered the bank wearing hats, sunglasses, respirators (surgical masks), gloves, and painters' coveralls, and armed with lethal-looking Airsoft pistols (pellet guns). Abigail waited outside in the family car, a green 1999 Volkswagen Jetta equipped with stolen license plates taped over their own.

"I didn't feel like a criminal ... I didn't load my pistol. I knew I wasn't going to shoot anybody. And I kept telling myself that whatever money I got was insured, so who was really being hurt?" —Scott Catt

The second robbery, which occurred November 9, 2012, took place at the First Community Credit Union in Katy. Because preliminary observations of the intended target showed a construction project was taking place nearby, Scott and Hayden wore bright orange safety vests and sunglasses to blend in with the numerous construction workers in the area. This time, Hayden wore a fake mustache, and Scott wore his familiar painter's mask. Abigail Catt once again drove the getaway vehicle.

Together, the two robberies netted the family $170,000 from the Texas banks.

== Capture ==
Police investigating the robberies as captured on the bank's CCTV footage of the second robbery in Houston, noted the newness of the orange safety vests the duo wore. By viewing recent video footage of area hardware store transactions, they were able to trace the purchase of the vests to a nearby Home Depot, where the Catt siblings were clearly identified buying the vests with their father's credit card. On the morning of November 9, 2012, as the Catt family was making the final preparations for their third and fourth robberies in the area (which were both scheduled for the next day), Scott and his son were arrested at their apartment without incident. After interviewing both of them and contacting Abby, she turned herself in the same day.

== Sentencing ==
Although the statute of limitations for the Oregon robberies had expired by the time of the family's capture, they were still able to be considered in the sentencing phase of the trial. On November 14, 2013, in plea arrangements, Hayden Catt accepted a ten-year sentence in prison while his sister Abigail was given five years—both being found guilty of one count of aggravated robbery. The following month, Ronald "Scott" Catt pleaded guilty to aggravated robbery and received a 24-year prison sentence. The FBI suspected the father had committed other bank robberies in Oregon, but those were before his children were taking any part in robbing banks.

=== Release ===
On September 11, 2015, it was reported that Abigail Catt was granted parole after spending two years and 11 months of her five-year sentence at Fort Bend County Jail. The sheriff of Fort Bend had held her at the jail instead of sending her to the prison due to the circumstances and him seeing her as a victim and wanting to help her prepare for a promising future. Following her release, however, she was re-jailed for over a year due to parole violations. In 2019, she was expecting her first child with her then-boyfriend.

Having served his sentence in Hightower Unit Prison in Texas, Hayden Catt was released from jail in 2022.
