= Cinco Ranch, Texas =

- Planned community Census designated place

- Location within the state of Texas Cinco Ranch (the United States)
- Coordinates: 29°44′29″N 95°45′30″W
- Country: United States
- State: Texas
- Counties: Fort Bend, Harris

Area
  - Total: 12.64 sq mi (32.74 km^{2})
- Elevation: 108 ft (33 m)
- Time zone: UTC-6 (Central (CST))
  - Summer (DST): UTC-5 (CDT)
- FIPS code: 48-14929
- GNIS feature ID: 2407623

Cinco Ranch is a planned community located in the extraterritorial jurisdiction of the city of Houston within Fort Bend and Harris counties in the U.S. state of Texas. It lies approximately 25 miles (40 km) west of the Harris County seat of Houston and 10 miles (16 km) north of the Fort Bend County seat of Richmond. Cinco Ranch is considered to be part of the Greater Katy area and is roughly 10 miles southeast of the city of Katy. Cinco Ranch was defined as a census designated place in the 2000 U.S. census but has since grown to include additional area. As of the 2020 census, Cinco Ranch had a population of 16,899.

== History ==
=== The Blakelys, and Blakely Ranch (1824–1937) ===
Bassett "Papa" Blakely (sometimes misspelled Blakeley) (1873–1943) was born to Mary Foster Blakely and Thomas Blakely. Mary was Randolph Foster's daughter, and John Foster's grand-daughter; both of those men were part of the Old Three Hundred who were granted leagues of land when Texas was part of Mexico. Bassett Blakely inherited the land grant from his grandfather, and over time bought more land until he owned 15,000 acres (61 km^{2}). This was Blakely Ranch, and today's Cinco Ranch is on a portion of that land, on these land grants:

- Thomas Hobermaker survey: 4,605 acres granted to Hobermaker as a first class headright in the 1830s. He sold half of his land to George Cartwright who was one of the Old Three Hundred, and the Stephen Hobermaker survey also comes from this survey. Blakely bought the Thomas Hobermaker survey in 1918.
- Henry Looney survey: 320 acres granted to Looney as a third class headright in 1839. Blakely bought this in the early 1900s.
- E.M. McGinnis survey: Originally Mr. Symes's survey, which he bought from the state of Texas in 1876, and then sold to McGinnis in 1897. This was bought by the "five friends" later.

The state of Texas also granted surveys to other people and railroad companies to encourage building infrastructure. Some of those companies sold their surveys instead of building on them, and they are also part of the land that Blakely bought that is now part of Cinco Ranch; for example, land from:

- International & Great Northern Railroad
- Houston & Texas Central Railroad
- Ira H. Evans Survey: A Texas Speaker of the House who was involved in railroads and land development

The cowhands of Blakely Ranch annually drove 10,000 head of cattle to the railheads in Kansas. Because there were so many cattle on this working ranch and neighboring ranches, several movies were filmed here, including the 1924 North of 36 and the 1925 Womanhandled.

At some point, Bassett's wife Bonnie Dunlavy Blakely was sentenced to prison for selling narcotics, and in April 1931 she died. The next month, their son Bassett Blakely Jr. was charged with assault to murder and burglary by firearms and in 1935, he was sentenced to prison for the selling narcotics. In about 1937, the ranch was sold. Bassett Blakely died in 1943.

=== The five friends, and Cinco Ranch (1937–1984) ===
In 1937, five oil men of Houston bought about 4,880 acres of the Blakely Ranch from South Texas Commercial Bank for $50,000 cash (equivalent to $1.1 million in 2025), to use as a hunting preserve with country lodges and homes. They named it Cinco Ranch (cinco means "five" in Spanish) and incorporated themselves as Cinco Ranch Company:

- H.G. "Chad" Nelms, president of Cinco Ranch Company and independent oil operator, he had attended a range convention with Bassett Blakely in 1925
- William Meade "Fishback" Wheless, Sr, secretary-treasurer of Cinco Ranch Company, oil scout at the time and later vice president of land and leasing for Gulf Oil until retiring in 1955
- James Smither Abercrombie, inventor of the blowout preventor and later president of Cameron Iron Works
- Walter B. Pyron, Brigadier General and vice president of Gulf Oil
- Lenoir M. Josey, a successful wildcatter

The ranch was a profitable working ranch used for cattle, rice, and peanut farming. Only the Wheless family lived on the ranch, but all of the families visited on many holidays and weekends, making use of a huge clubhouse complete with two-bedroom wings.

Over the years, they added and sold parcels of land, and Wheless and Abercrombie bought out the other three members to own all the land that is current-day Cinco Ranch. In 1949, they sold 2,500 acres to the United States Army Corps of Engineers to increase the Barker Reservoir, used for flood control of Houston.

=== Cinco Ranch Venture (1984–1997) ===
In 1970, Robert Mosbacher bought Wheless's share of Cinco Ranch. Josephine Abercrombie inherited her father's share upon his death in 1975. In 1983, the politically connected Walter Mischer Sr. offered to buy the land. Mischer, Mosbacher, and Abercrombie requested the state highway department to build a 31-mile stretch of highway along the route defined in long-term plans for what is now Texas State Highway 99, the Grand Parkway, an engineering firm asked people to donate rights-of-way property, and Vinson & Elkins law firm drafted a bill to allow the donated land to be used. On June 27, 1984, State Representative Ed Emmett filed the drafted bill and that day Mosbacher and Abercrombie sold Cinco Ranch to Cinco Ranch Venture for $84 million—the largest raw land transaction in Houston's history. Cinco Ranch Venture consisted of:

- U.S. Home Corporation, a builder
- Mischer Corporation, headed by banker-developer Walter Mischer, Sr.
- American General Corporation, an insurance company

The bill passed in only a few weeks, and Governor Mark White signed it into law as The Texas Transportation Corporation Act, which privatized the land acquisition needed for roads. Weeks later, a private corporation was formed to build a proposed 150-mile loop around Houston, starting with a segment adjacent to Cinco Ranch. It was later discovered that Mischer's son, a director at Mosbacher Energy Corporation, and a real estate advisor for Abercrombie were on the new corporation's board; Mosbacher and Abercrombie held back land to sell later at a higher price; and Representative Ed Emmett also stood to gain. Mosbacher and Abercrombie sold 800 acres of the held-back land for commercial use, and sold a parcel closest to the edge of the parkway in 1985 for $12.9 million.

Houston's economy took a downturn in the 1980s as the price of oil dropped, and the housing market stalled for most of the decade. American General eventually bought out the other partners and in 1991, the Cinco Ranch planned community opened with 35 homes sold, another 110 under construction. Central to the community was the Cinco Ranch Beach Club, a manmade beach and swimming pool surrounded by a lake. In 1994, they added the Golf Club at Cinco Ranch, an 18-hole championship course designed by architect Carlton Gipson, with an 11,000 square foot clubhouse.

=== Cinco Ranch, a Terrabrook community (1997–2003) ===
In 1997, Terrabrook (a subsidiary of Westbrook Partners) bought Cinco Ranch and other American General land development assets. They continued to expand Cinco Ranch and add amenities.

In 2000, they opened the Cinco Ranch Bayou Trail within a wetlands nature preserve along the Willow Fork section of Buffalo Bayou, with oxbow lakes filled with fish, turtles, and wildlife, and platforms for viewing and fishing. In 2002, this trail was extended another 1.5 miles. That year, they also added more pools with water park elements, and one full-scale water park. Terrabrook also donated land to build a 33,000 square foot Cinco Ranch branch of Fort Bend County Libraries.

In 2002, Cinco Ranch also acquired another 1,828 acres to its west and southwest borders, increasing the size of the community to about 7,228 acres to add another 4,000 homes and 180 acres of commercial development. Terrabrook only developed the area to the west (west of TX-99).

=== Cinco Ranch I and II, Newland communities (2003–2020) ===
In late 2003, Newland bought most of Terrabrook's communities, including Cinco Ranch. In 2005, Newland passed control of the homeowners association to the residential property owners. With development completed, this part of the community is now called Cinco Ranch I, and development began with Cinco Ranch II.

Cinco Ranch I and Cinco Ranch II have separate homeowners associations, but have a reciprocal use agreement to share amenities. Cinco Ranch II comprises Cinco Ranch Southwest and Cinco Ranch Northwest.

In 2007, Newland began developing the land acquired by Terrabrook southwest of Cinco Ranch I; this is Cinco Ranch Southwest. In 2010, Newland bought another 492 acres for expansion, as part of a joint venture with Sekisui House. This is Cinco Ranch Northwest; it is not contiguous with the rest of Cinco Ranch.

In 2020, Newland Real Estate (Newland Communities) completed building and selling homes in Cinco Ranch, having been a best-selling community for many years and having won multiple awards for its design.

== Amenities ==
Cinco Ranch (Cinco Ranch I and II) has:

- 15,098 homes (8,740 in Cinco Ranch I and 6,358 in Cinco Ranch II) on 8,092 acres
- Miles of paved and unpaved trails
- 91 parks, pocket parks, playgrounds, picnic areas with barbecue grills, gazebos, and greenway spaces
- 17 tennis and pickleball courts
- 11 pools and water parks
- 7 lake areas, some stocked for catch-and-release fishing and some with paddle boats and kayaks
- 6 fields for league athletics (soccer, baseball, football)
- 3 sand volleyball courts
- 2 full-size basketball courts and 1 half-court
- 1 Beach Club and 1 Lake House
- 1 golf club and 18-hole, par-71 golf course
- 1 wetlands nature preserve and trail with viewing and fishing platforms
- 1 cricket pitch field
- 1 lakeside Exer-Trail
- 34 acre commercial "town center" with shopping, dining, and entertainment (LaCenterra at Cinco Ranch) plus other businesses throughout the community

== Geography ==
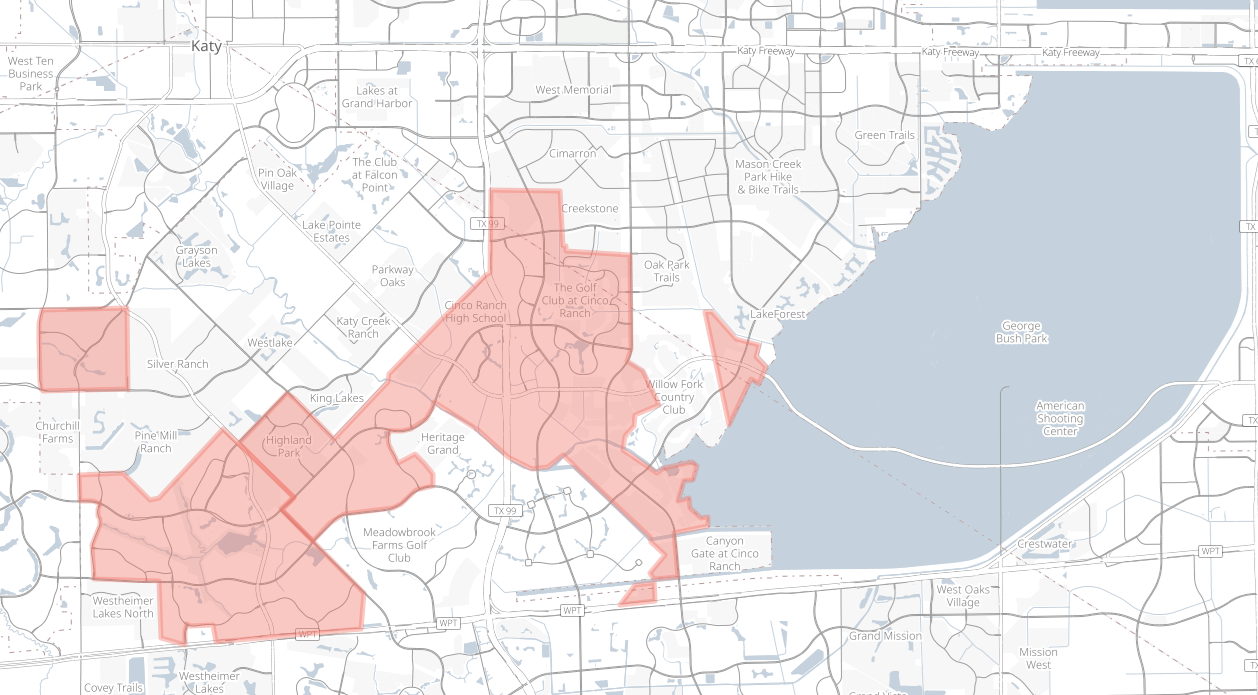
Map of the Cinco Ranch planned community in Katy, Texas USA

Cinco Ranch is located at 29°44′29″N 95°45′30″W (29.741522, -95.758343).

The U.S. Census indicates that Cinco Ranch covers a total area of 4.9 square miles. However, the Cinco Ranch community has expanded beyond the area defined by the census to 8,092 acres (12.64 square miles) and 15,098 homes. The area to the far west of Houston continues to grow and diversify.

== Demographics ==
Historical population
Census	Pop.	Note	%±
2000	11,196		—
2010	18,274		63.2%
2020	16,899		−7.5%
2023 (est.)	19,139	▲	13.3%
U.S. Decennial Census; 1850–1900 1910; 1920 1930 1940; 1950 1960 1970; 1980 1990 2000; 2010 2020

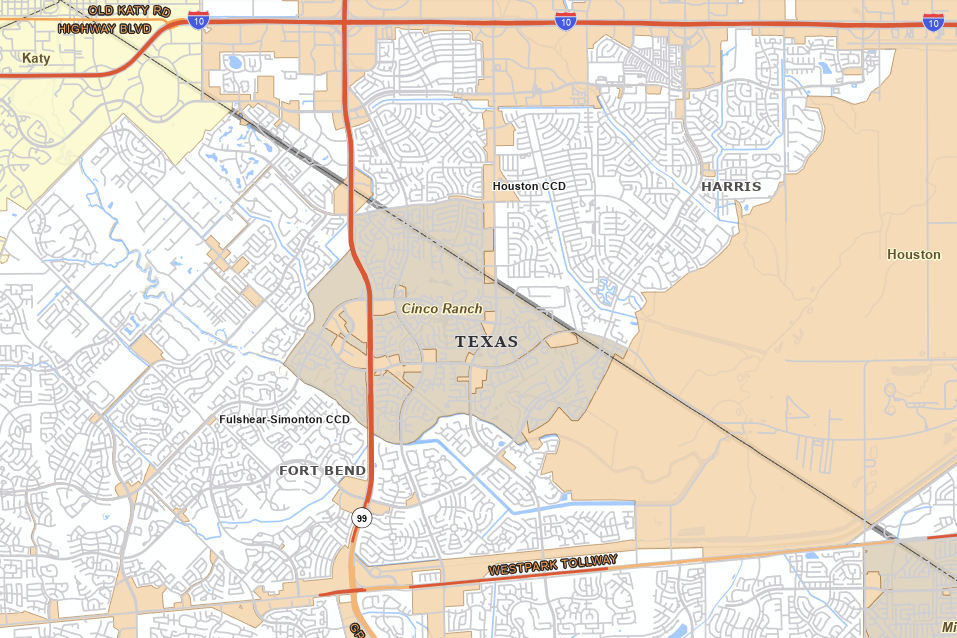
Map of the Cinco Ranch CDP as defined by the US Census Bureau (2024)

Cinco Ranch was first listed as a census designated place in the 2000 U.S. census. In the 2010 U.S. census, part of the CDP was annexed to the city of Houston. The area defined by the census does not include the expansions since 2000.

=== Racial and ethnic composition ===
Cinco Ranch CDP, Texas – Racial and ethnic composition Note: the US Census treats Hispanic/Latino as an ethnic category. This table excludes Latinos from the racial categories and assigns them to a separate category. Hispanics/Latinos may be of any race.
Race / Ethnicity (NH = Non-Hispanic)	Pop 2000	Pop 2010	Pop 2020	% 2000	% 2010	% 2020
White alone (NH)	9,325	12,537	10,054	83.29%	68.61%	59.49%
Black or African American alone (NH)	315	634	556	2.81%	3.47%	3.29%
Native American or Alaska Native alone (NH)	23	38	22	0.21%	0.21%	0.13%
Asian alone (NH)	739	2,343	2,470	6.60%	12.82%	14.62%
Native Hawaiian or Pacific Islander alone (NH)	2	6	9	0.02%	0.03%	0.05%
Other race alone (NH)	35	52	111	0.31%	0.28%	0.66%
Mixed race or Multiracial (NH)	103	315	787	0.92%	1.72%	4.66%
Hispanic or Latino (any race)	654	2,349	2,890	5.84%	12.85%	17.10%
Total	11,196	18,274	16,899	100.00%	100.00%	100.00%

=== 2020 census ===
As of the 2020 census, Cinco Ranch had a population of 16,899. The median age was 41.5 years. 26.4% of residents were under the age of 18 and 13.1% of residents were 65 years of age or older. For every 100 females there were 96.4 males, and for every 100 females age 18 and over there were 96.0 males age 18 and over.

100.0% of residents lived in urban areas, while 0.0% lived in rural areas.

There were 5,683 households in Cinco Ranch, of which 43.4% had children under the age of 18 living in them. Of all households, 74.9% were married-couple households, 9.0% were households with a male householder and no spouse or partner present, and 14.1% were households with a female householder and no spouse or partner present. About 12.3% of all households were made up of individuals and 4.2% had someone living alone who was 65 years of age or older.

There were 5,864 housing units, of which 3.1% were vacant. The homeowner vacancy rate was 0.8% and the rental vacancy rate was 8.1%.

== Government and infrastructure ==
Cinco Ranch is governed by:

- Political subdivisions, including:
  - City of Houston extraterritorial jurisdiction
  - Fort Bend and Harris counties (most of Cinco Ranch is in Fort Bend county)
  - Katy Independent School District
  - Houston Community College System (Junior college district)
- Special purpose districts, which are a type of political subdivision and include:
  - Municipal utility districts (MUDs)
  - Willow Fork drainage district
  - Fort Bend and Harris-Galveston subsidence districts
  - North Fort Bend regional water authority
  - Harris Health System and contracted indigent health care
  - Fort Bend emergency services
  - Fort Bend county assistance districts (CADs), primarily for roads and law enforcement
- Private non-profits such as homeowner associations

In statewide government, Cinco Ranch is part of:

- Texas's 26th House of Representatives district and Texas's 132nd House of Representatives district
- Texas Senate, District 17
- Texas State Board of Education District 7 and District 8

On a federal level, Cinco Ranch is part of:

- Texas's 22nd congressional district
- Represented by US Senators from Texas

=== City of Houston and Greater Katy area ===
Cinco Ranch is in the extraterritorial jurisdiction (ETJ) of the City of Houston: Houston's ETJ extends up to five miles from its city limits, as allowed by the 1963 Texas Municipal Annexation Act, and it annexed the neighboring Barker Reservoir in the 1970s.

As an ETJ, Houston can regulate development of Cinco Ranch and can collect sales taxes, but is not required to provide city services such as police, water, or fire department, and Cinco Ranch residents cannot vote in city elections. Cities can annex ETJs, so Houston could annex Cinco Ranch, but the city would be required to assume the debt of Cinco Ranch's MUDs.

Cinco Ranch also is part of the Greater Katy area, but not part of the City of Katy or its ETJ.

=== Community assets and covenants ===
Cinco Ranch has property owners associations (POAs) that manage, maintain, and govern shared community assets and enforce community covenants. Each are governed by a board of directors, and the boards hire management companies to perform ongoing administrative and operational tasks.

In Cinco Ranch I:

- Cinco Residential Property Association (CRPA) oversees residential neighborhoods, maintaining amenities like arks and pools, and establishing and enforcing architectural guidelines for homeowners.
- Cinco Landscape Management Association (CLMA) is responsible for shared landscaping, including boulevards and entrances.
- Cinco Commercial Property Association (CCPA) governs commercial parcels, maintaining appearance, signage, and property use to maintain harmony with the surrounding community.

In Cinco Ranch II:

- Cinco Ranch Residential Association II (CRRA II) manages community standards, amenities, and common area maintenance, including roadside and entrance landscaping.
- Cinco Ranch Commercial Association II ensures visual consistency and compliance with development restrictions in commercial properties.

=== Emergency medical services and fire departments ===
Emergency medical services (EMS) in Cinco Ranch primarily are provided by Fort Bend County Emergency Services District No. 2, which also operates the Willowfork Fire Department. Willowfork Fire Department has three stations and has attained an ISO Fire Service Suppression Rating of Class 1 (the highest class).

The emergency services district is funded by property tax, and is governed by five board members who are appointed by the Fort Bend County Commissioners Court for two-year terms.

=== Hospital districts and public health ===
Public health services, such as restaurant inspections, mosquito control, and immunizations, are provided by the counties: Fort Bend County Health and Human Services and Harris County Public Health.

Hospital districts provide healthcare for low-income residents who fall into the Medicaid coverage gap (that is, they are excluded from Medicaid eligibility, are uninsured, and are unable to pay for basic medical services). In Texas, the state's Indigent Health Care and Treatment Act of 1985 requires counties to subsidize basic healthcare costs for indigent residents. Some counties, like Harris County, meet this requirement with hospital districts. Other counties, like Fort Bend County, establish County Indigent Health Care Programs (CIHCPs).

Fort Bend's Health and Human Services manages the county's CIHCP. They contract with OakBend Medical Center, which is a charity hospital with three campuses in the county but none in Cinco Ranch. They also have contracts with AccessHealth (with clinics in the county but not in Cinco Ranch) as well as other nearby hospitals.

Cinco Ranch residents who live in Harris county are served by the Harris Health hospital district, which similarly has clinics nearby in the county but not in Cinco Ranch.

=== Law enforcement ===
Cinco Ranch does not have its own police department. Law enforcement comes from the counties. The Sheriffs are elected by voters in their counties and Constables are elected by voters in their precinct, each for four-year terms.

In Fort Bend County:

- The Sheriff's Office provides crime prevention and community programs like car seat safety inspections, vacation house watches, and telephone reassurance program for seniors and disabled citizens.
- The Constable, Precinct 1, primarily serve warrants and serve as Bailiffs in our courts. The Cinco Ranch homeowners associations, Cinco Ranch's MUDs, and Fort Bend County Toll Road Authority contract off-duty Fort Bend constables for patrols.

Katy ISD Police Department provides around-the-clock security for all Katy ISD campuses and facilities, of which Cinco Ranch schools are a part. They also have community programs that help children during the winter holidays and provide teddy bears for special needs children.

In Harris County:

- The Sheriff's Office in District IV patrols, investigates crimes, responds to incidents, and coordinates with police in bordering jurisdictions. They also have specialized divisions like a bomb squad, SWAT, division for livestock crimes, and police dog teams.
- The Constable, Precinct 5, also provides law enforcement and programs like a citizen police academy, a watch program for senior citizens, and an animal cruelty taskforce.

=== Municipal services (water, sewage, and trash) ===
In 1985, Texas created municipal utility districts (MUDs) as a political subdivision, mostly to provide municipal services in extraterritorial jurisdictions like Cinco Ranch and other suburban or rural areas. These services can include water, wastewater treatment, stormwater management, trash disposal and recycling services, and sometimes fire departments, parks and recreation facilities, and roads. Developers or property owners create MUDs to issue bonds and levy property taxes to support this infrastructure, which can take up to 30 years to pay off. The Texas Commission on Environmental Quality oversees MUDs. Each MUD has a board with five members who are property owners or residents living within the MUD's district and who are elected by the district's residents to four-year terms on a staggered basis with elections held every two years.

Walter Mischer Sr., whose company Mischer Corporation bought the Cinco Ranch land as part of Cinco Ranch Ventures in 1984, was instrumental in persuading Texas to create MUDs. Today, Cinco Ranch is divided into 19 MUDs: Cinco MUDs No. 1–12, Cinco Southwest MUDs 1–4, Fort Bend MUDs 35 and 58, and Cornerstones MUD. They provide water, wastewater (sewage) treatments, and drainage within their district boundaries, and contract with companies to provide trash pickup and recycling services. Some MUDs also provide other services and amenities like parks and security patrols.

=== Roads ===
Most of Cinco Ranch's roads are maintained by Fort Bend county, through property taxes and sales taxes levied by county assistance districts (CADs).

Texas started CADs for some counties in 1999 and allowed them for all counties in 2007. CADs are a political subdivision that levy a sales tax at businesses within the district's boundaries for roads, law enforcement, recreational facilities, firefighting, and economic development. Fort Bend county began creating CADs in 2011; Fort Bend CADs 1, 7, 9, and 10 are within Cinco Ranch and levy a 1%–2% sales tax. Because CADs levy sales taxes, usually their boundaries mostly enclose commercial property. People who live within the boundary vote on whether or not to create a CAD, but these elections have few (or sometimes no) voters because it is commercial property. For example, the election to create Fort Bend CAD 1, which encloses LaCenterra at Cinco Ranch, had only two voters and four eligible voters. The CADs within Cinco Ranch are governed by the Fort Bend county commissioner court.

Within its first three years, Fort Bend's CADs generated more than $8 million in sales tax revenue, with more than $6 million coming from CAD 1 in Cinco Ranch. In their first years, the county commissioners mentioned the tax revenue could be used for libraries and community centers, but in the years since it has been used primarily for roads, traffic signs, and additional law enforcement.

=== Surface water and groundwater ===
Subsidence contributes to flooding, and in the area of Cinco Ranch it's mostly caused by pumping water out of the ground (groundwater) instead of using surface water. It's a particular problem in areas like the Gulf Coast, with high demand for drinking water and soil that has a lot of clay which compresses after water is removed. The compaction of the clay is irreversible, but subsidence districts aim to prevent further subsidence.

The state created the Fort Bend Subsidence District (FBSD) in 1989, and the district required all groundwater users in its Area A (which includes Cinco Ranch) to reduce groundwater usage by 60% by 2025. In 2005, the state legislature created North Fort Bend Water Authority (NFBWA) to help municipal utility districts (MUDs) comply with these mandates. Cinco Ranch's MUDs are required to participate in NFBWA's plan, which reduces groundwater use by buying surface water from the City of Houston, selling it to the MUDs in its district, and charging the MUDs a fee to fund water infrastructure projects such as the $1.2 billion project to bring surface water from Lake Houston (requiring over 55 miles of pipeline). MUDs pass along this fee to residents and businesses in their monthly water bill.

Cinco Ranch is in NFBWA's precincts 4, 5, 6, 7, and each precinct has one member on its board of directors. The MUDs elect the board members.

== Education ==
=== Primary and secondary schools ===
==== Public schools ====
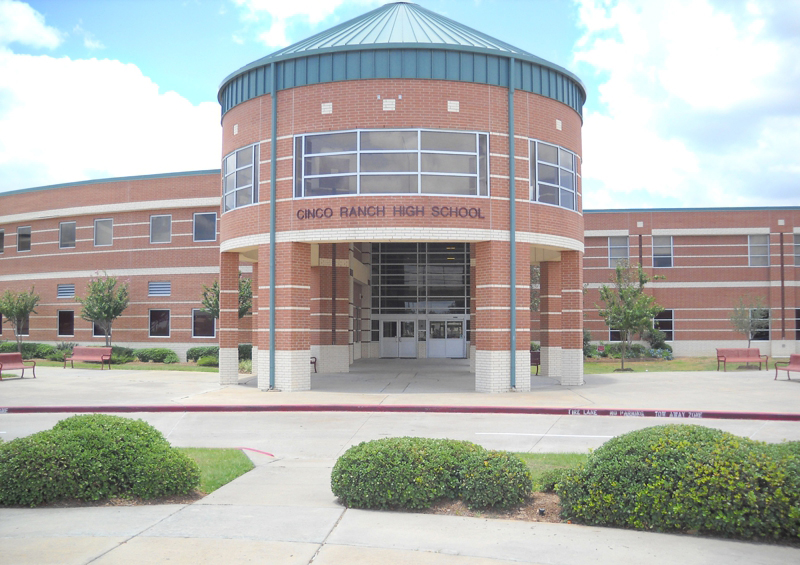
Cinco Ranch High School

Pupils in Cinco Ranch are zoned to schools of the Katy Independent School District in and around Cinco Ranch.

Elementary schools in Cinco Ranch:

- Betty Sue Creech Elementary School
- Bonnie Holland Elementary School
- Edna Mae Fielder Elementary School
- Odessa Kilpatrick Elementary School
- James E. Williams Elementary School
- Jo Ella Exley Elementary School
- Stan Stanley Elementary School
- Tom Wilson Elementary School
- Fred & Patti Shafer Elementary School
- MayDell Jenks Elementary School

Other elementary schools serving Cinco Ranch:

- Michael L. Griffin Elementary School

Junior high schools in Cinco Ranch:

- Rodger & Ellen Beck Junior High School
- Beckendorff Junior High School
- Cinco Ranch Junior High School
- Seven Lakes Junior High School

Other junior high schools serving Cinco Ranch:

- Joe Adams Junior High School (opening Fall 2019)
- James & Sharon Tays Junior High School
- Garland McMeans Junior High School (Meadow Ridge, Park View, & Park Hollow neighborhoods)

High schools in Cinco Ranch

- Cinco Ranch High School (uninc. Fort Bend County)
- Seven Lakes High School (uninc. Fort Bend County)
- Obra D. Tompkins High School (uninc. Fort Bend County)

Other high schools serving Cinco Ranch

- James E. Taylor High School (Meadow Ridge, Park View, & Park Hollow neighborhoods)
- Jordan High School (Cinco Ranch II)

Schools within the CDP boundaries are Fielder Elementary, Williams Elementary, McMeans Junior High (partial), and Cinco Ranch High.

==== Private schools ====
As of 2019 The Village School in the Energy Corridor area has a bus service to Cinco Ranch.

=== Higher education ===
The Houston Community College System serves areas in Katy ISD, and therefore Cinco Ranch. The Northwest College's Katy Campus is in an unincorporated section of Harris County.

=== Public libraries ===
Cinco Ranch is not part of a special-purpose library district. Instead, all Cinco Ranch residents are served by both county libraries, the Houston Public Library, and the statewide TexShare program.

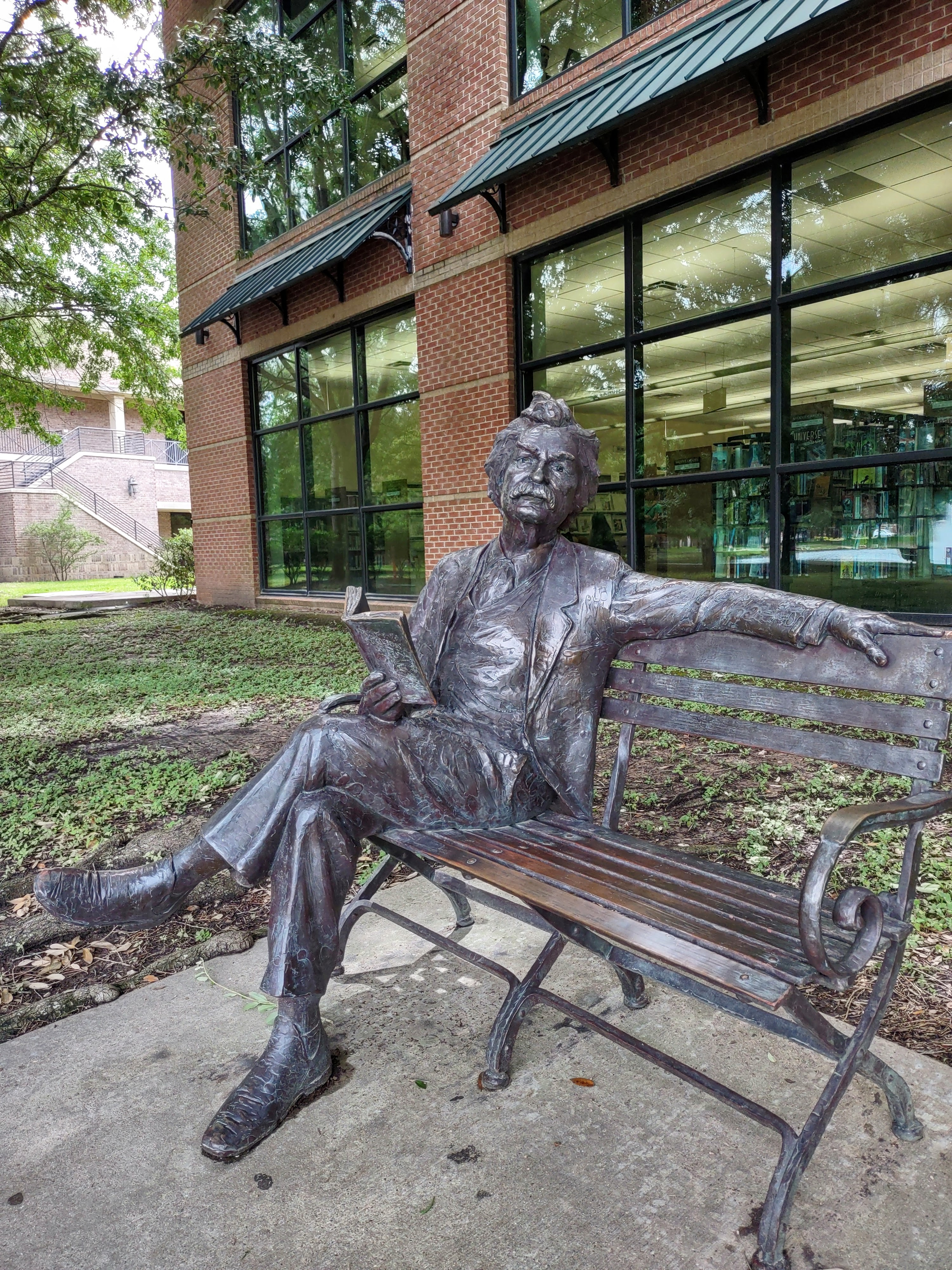
Sculpture of Mark Twain, sitting on a park bench and reading his Adventures of Huckleberry Finn, was created by sculptor Gary Lee Price and donated to the Cinco Ranch branch of Fort Bend County Libraries in April 2005, by Newland Communities. He sits behind the two-story library building, facing a lake.

The Cinco Ranch branch of Fort Bend County Libraries first opened in 1998 as a single room at a University of Houston campus in Cinco Ranch, and then quickly moved to the larger, former Cinco Ranch development sales office. The community asked for a larger branch, and Fort Bend County Judge James Adolphus organized efforts to have a library established. Adolphus negotiated the donation of a library site from Terrabrook, the Cinco Ranch developer at the time, secured a challenge grant, and hosted a fundraising gala. The current 33,500 square feet (3,110 m^{2}) library opened on April 3, 2004. The Cinco Ranch branch has computers, 3D printers, and wi-fi for public use; hosts literacy and citizenship classes; and has daytime programming for children and adults.

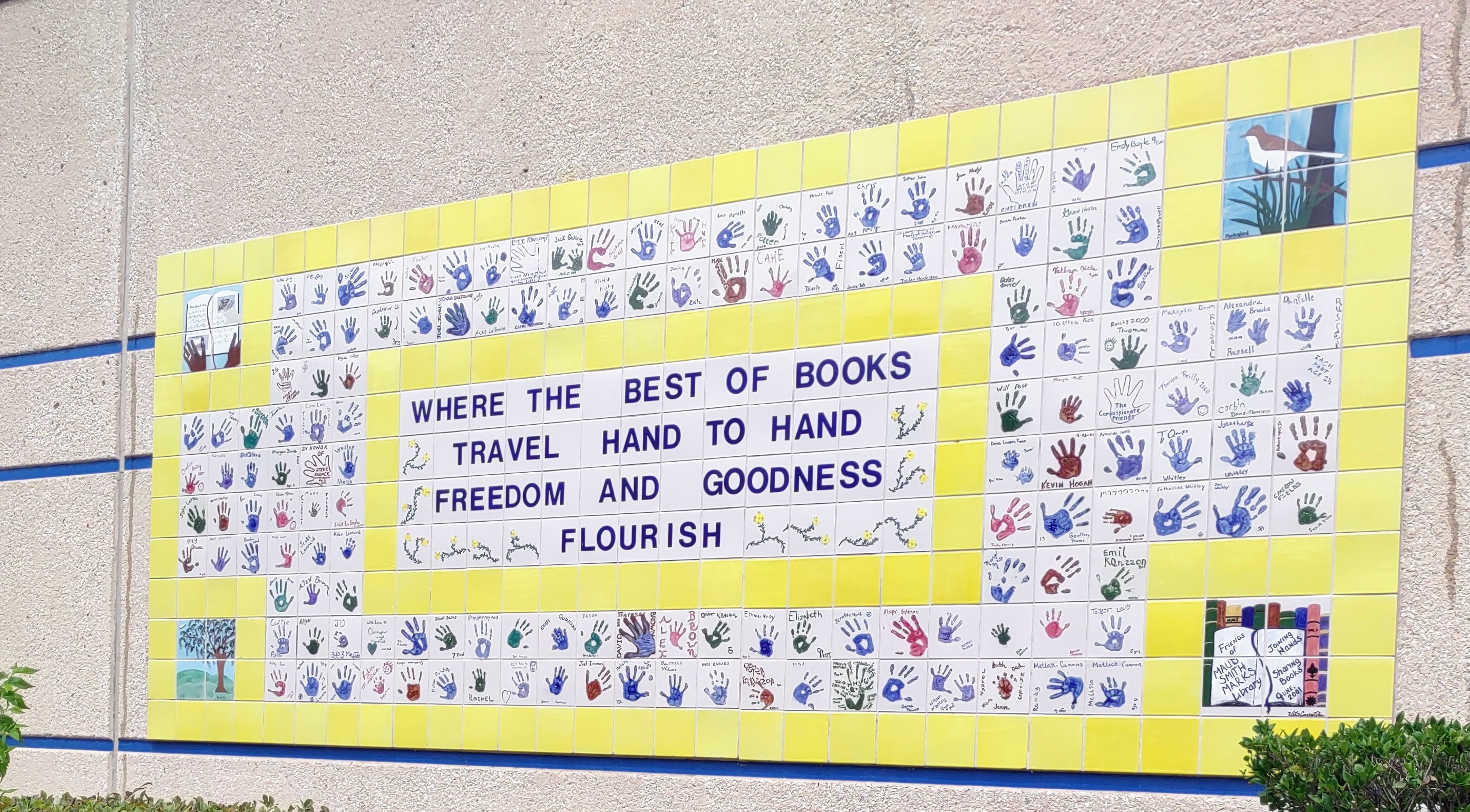
One of two tile murals outside the Maud Smith Marks branch of Harris County Public Library shows handprints from friends of the library

All Cinco Ranch residents also are served by Harris County Public Library and are eligible for their free Knowledge Card, which gives them full access to all 26 branch locations. The Maud Smith Marks branch is in the nearby Kelliwood neighborhood. It is named after a woman who, in 1920, ran the first county library in Barker, Texas, the general area of today's Cinco Ranch. The current location opened in 1993 and has maker equipment such as 3D printers and Cricut cutting machines; hosts citizenship and technology classes; and has programming for children.

Like all Texans, people in Cinco Ranch can get a free Houston Public Library MYLink card to access ebooks and other online media, and to access other library offerings including their technology centers such as makerspaces, graphic design studios, music studios, and craft workshops.

The Fort Bend and Harris county libraries participate in the statewide TexShare program, so Cinco Ranch residents also can borrow books and other physical materials, plus access databases and other resources, from about 500 public, academic, and medical libraries statewide. This program is funded by a grant from the US Institute of Museum and Library Services.

== Shopping ==
- LaCenterra at Cinco Ranch
- Katy Mills
