= Fort Bend County Libraries =

Public library system in Texas

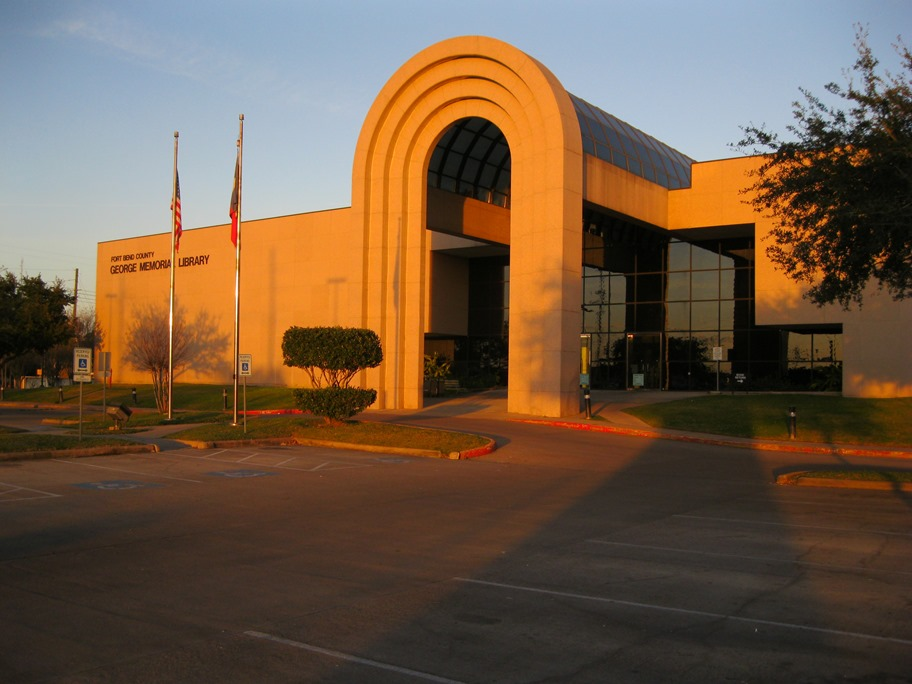
- George Memorial Library in Richmond, Texas
- 29.574311°N 95.650677°W
- Location: Fort Bend County, Texas
- Established: 1947
- Branches: 11

Collection
- Size: 1,013,798 (2016)

Access and use
- Circulation: 4,732,773 (2016)
- Members: 372,994 (2016)

Other information
- Budget: $626,017 (2016)
- Director: Clara Russell
- Website: www.fortbend.lib.tx.us

Fort Bend County Libraries is a public library system serving the county of Fort Bend, Texas. The main library, the George Memorial Library, is located in Richmond, Texas.

== History ==
Prior to the founding of the Fort Bend County Library there existed a Share-a-Book Club run by ladies of the towns constituting the area. In 1947, these ladies appealed to the Commissioners' Court of Fort Bend County to establish a library which was granted and constructed by 1948. The original building held 1,000 books but was quickly deemed to be insufficient for growth and a new library underwent construction in November 1948. At a cost of $50,000 the new building opened on July 7, 1949 and held 8,111 volumes. It received an addition in 1958 which added a historical room and a Daughters of the American Revolution collection.

== Branches ==
Name	Location
Albert George Branch Library	Needville
Bob Lutts Fulshear/Simonton Branch Library	Fulshear
Cinco Ranch Branch Library	Cinco Ranch
First Colony Branch Library	Sugar Land
George Memorial Library	Richmond
Fort Bend County Law Library	Richmond
Mamie George Branch Library	Stafford
Mission Bend Branch Library	Mission Bend
Missouri City Branch Library	Missouri City
Sienna Branch Library	Sienna
Sugar Land Branch Library	Sugar Land
University Branch Library	Sugar Land

== Gallery ==
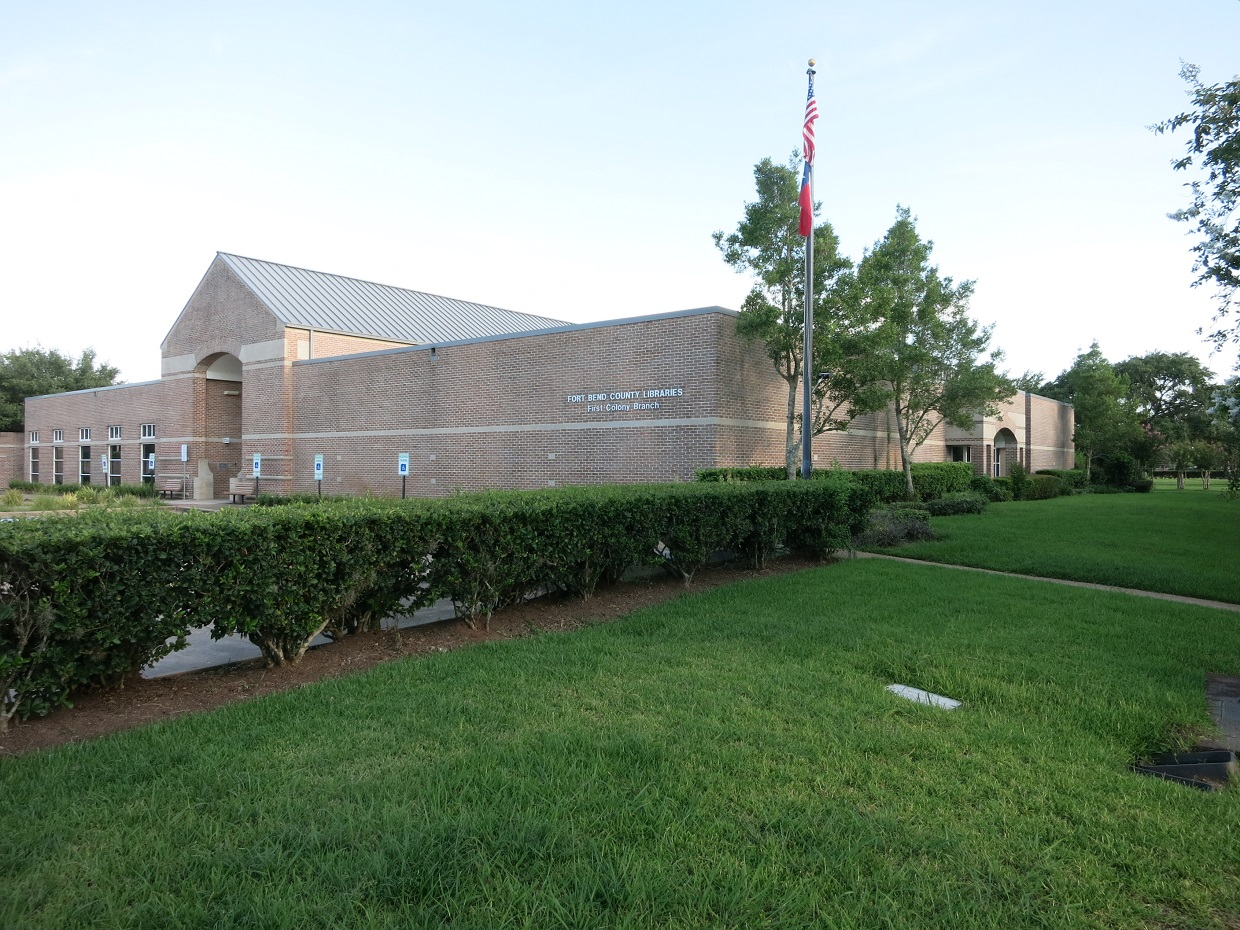
First Colony Library in Sugar Land

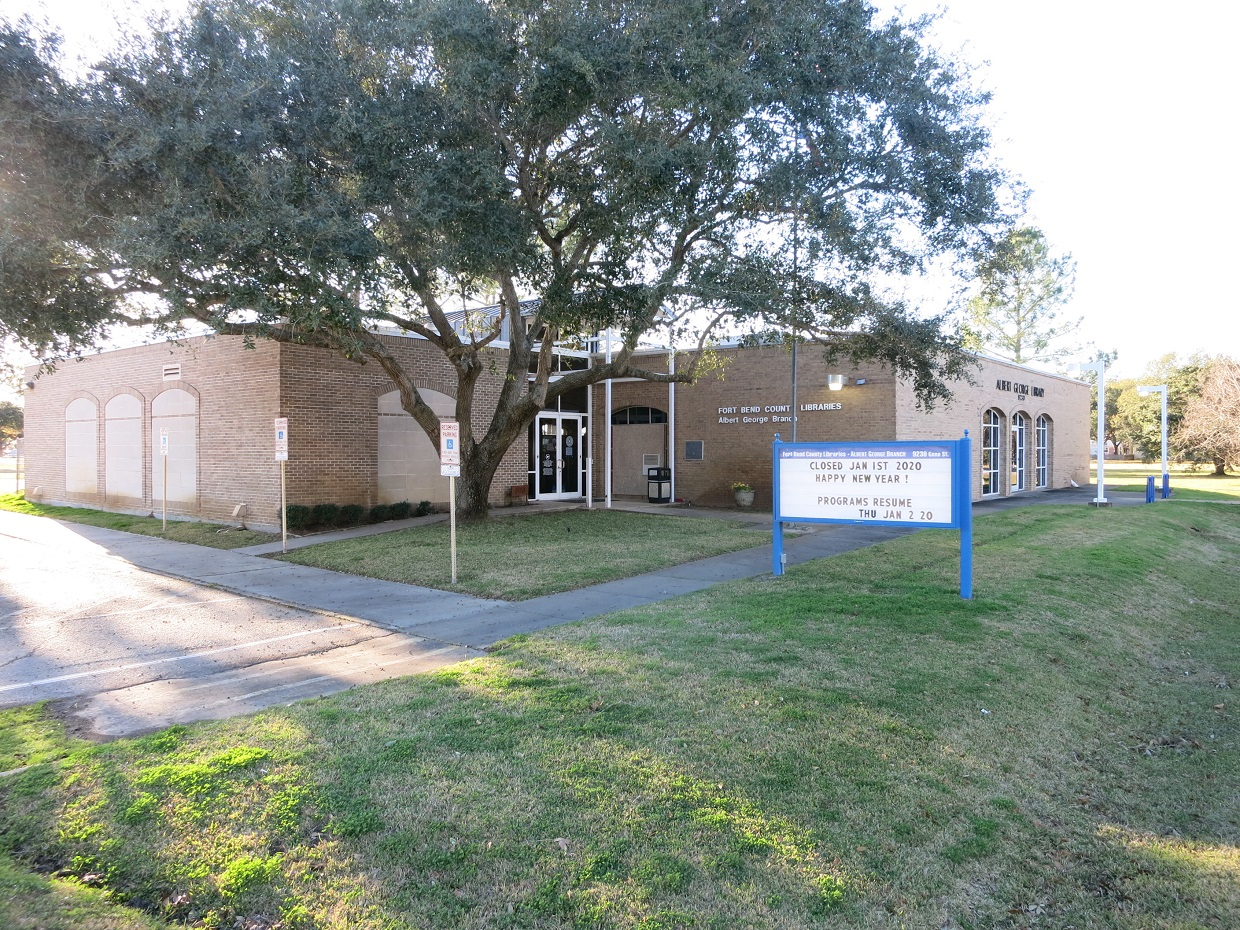
Albert George Library in Needville

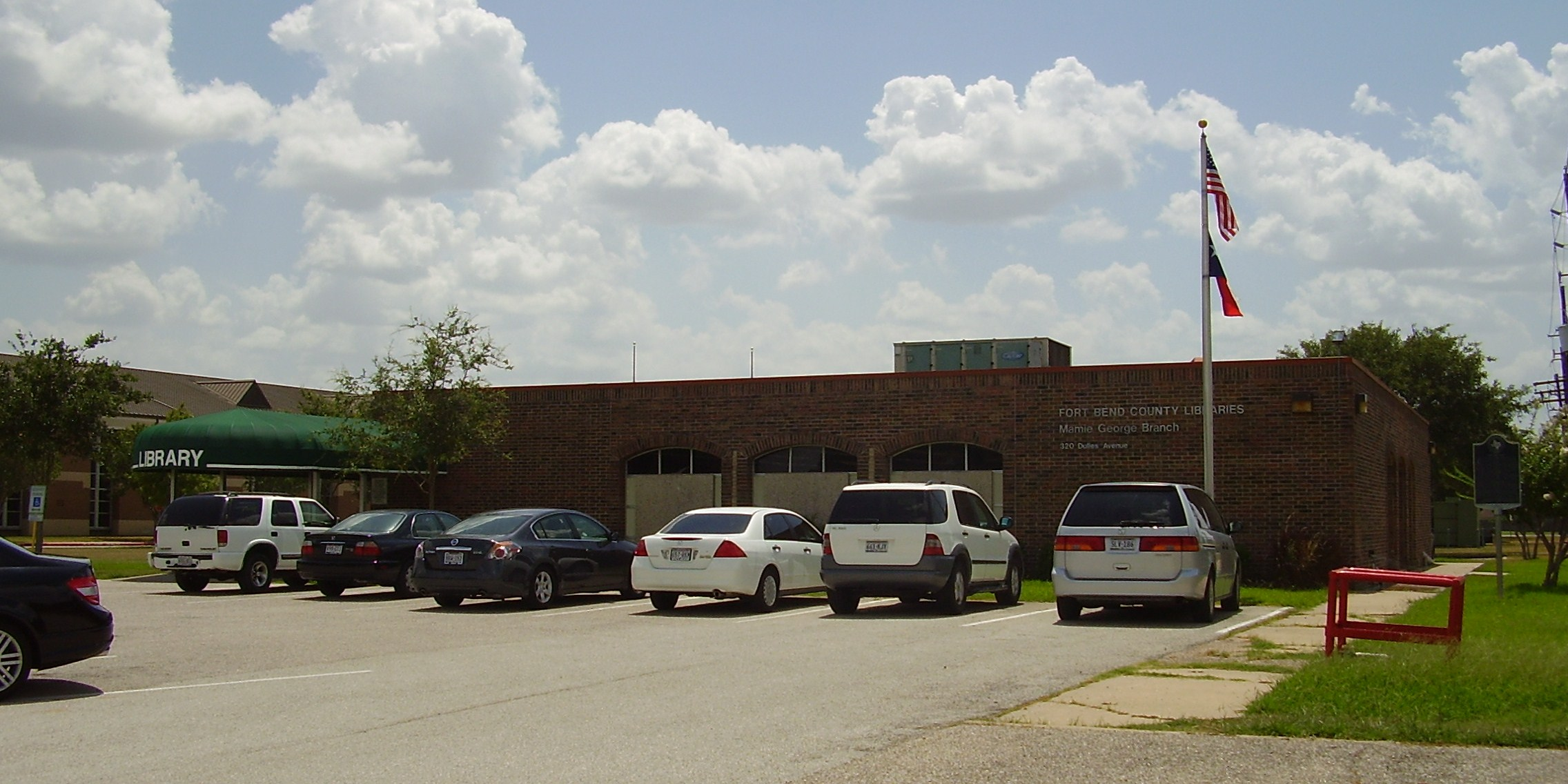
Mamie George Branch in Sugar Land

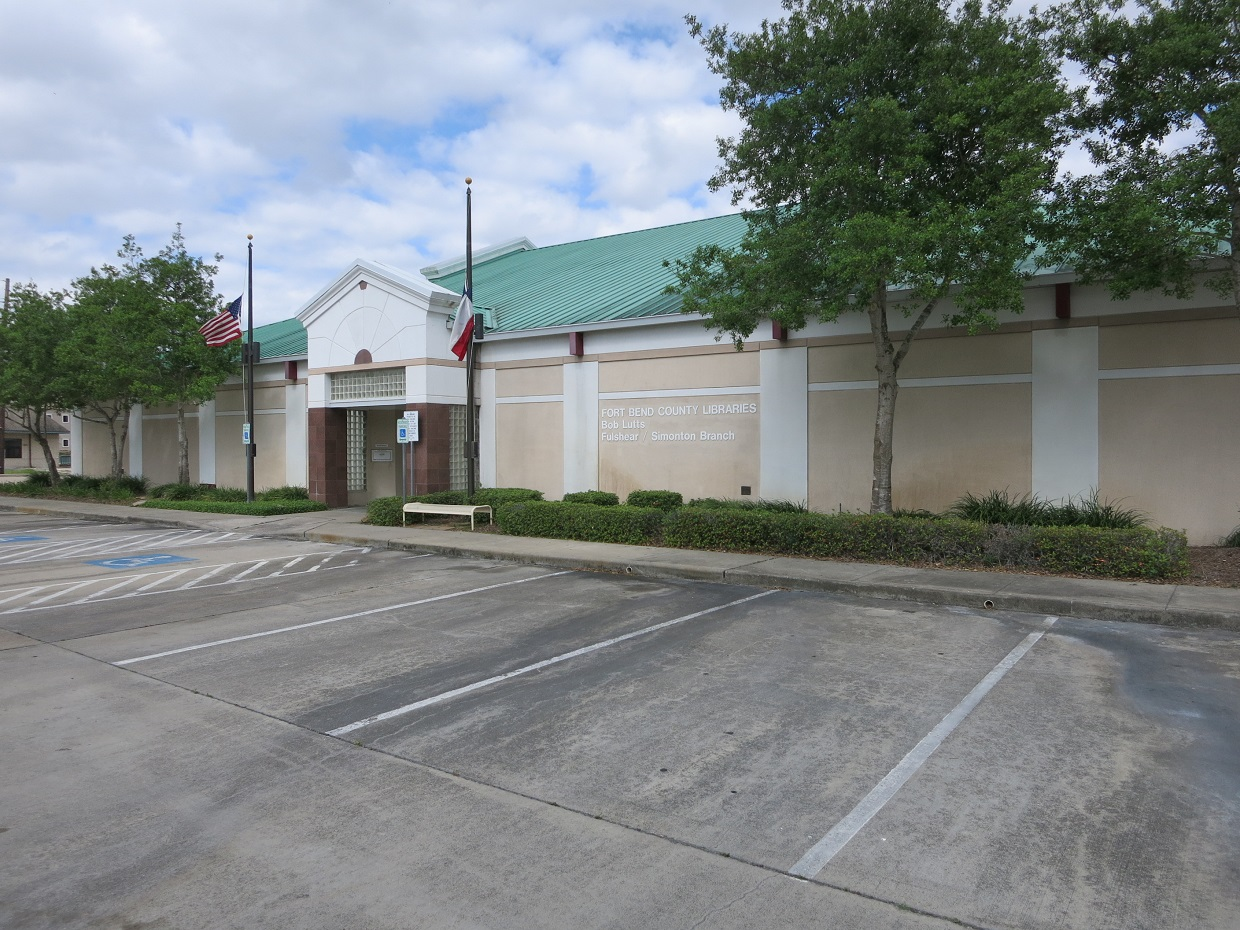
Bob Lutts Library in Fulshear

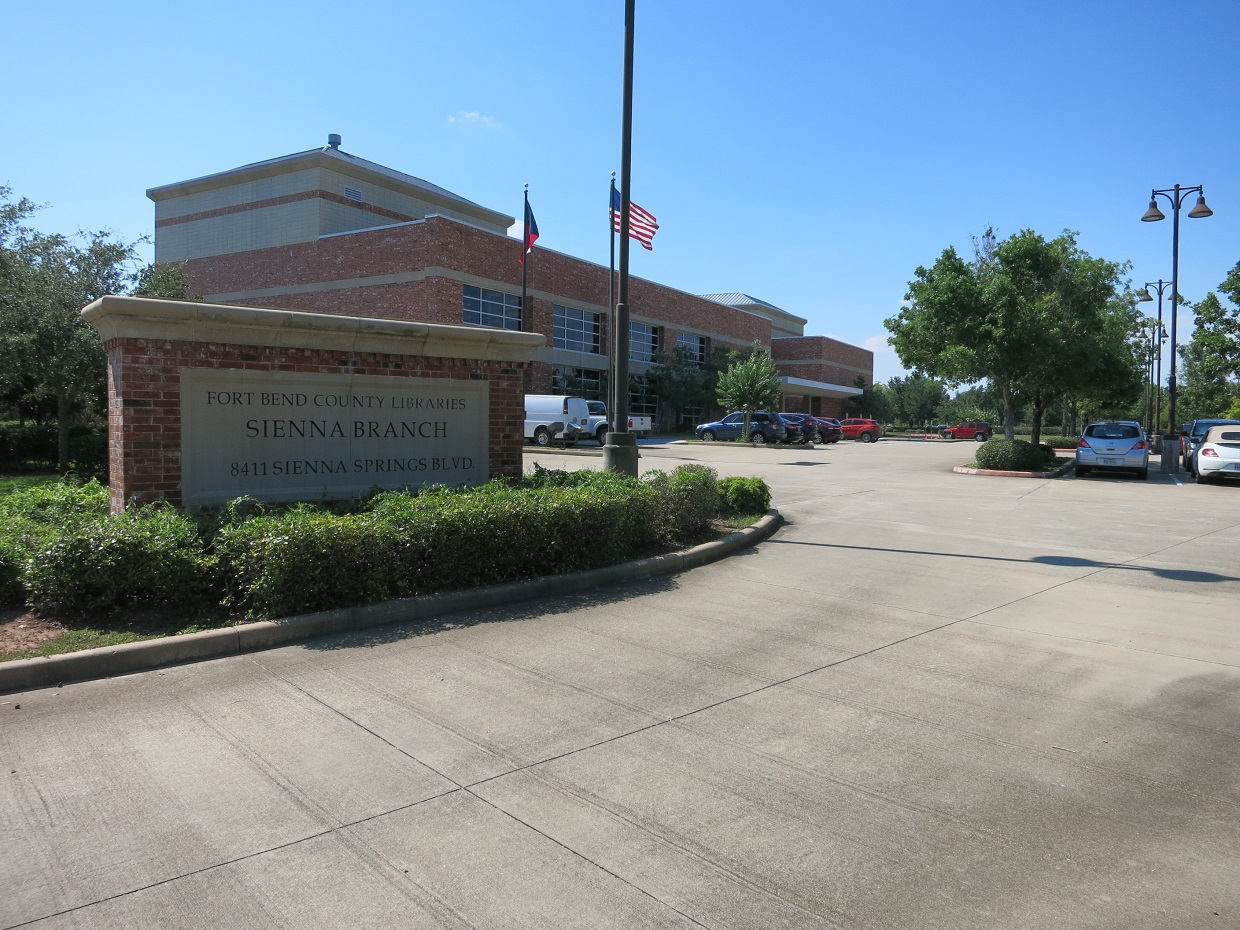
Sienna Branch Library in Sienna

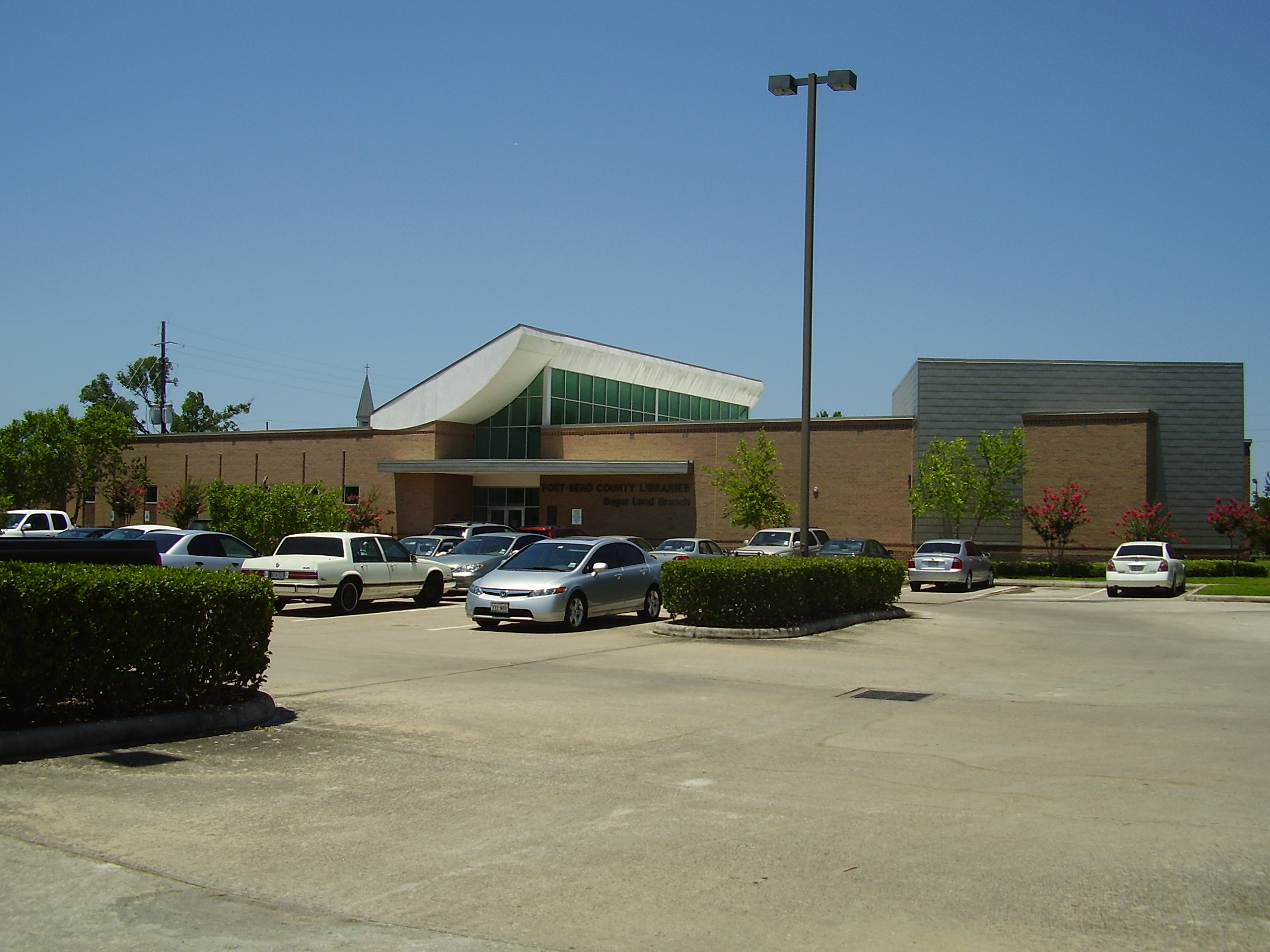
Sugar Land Branch in Sugar Land

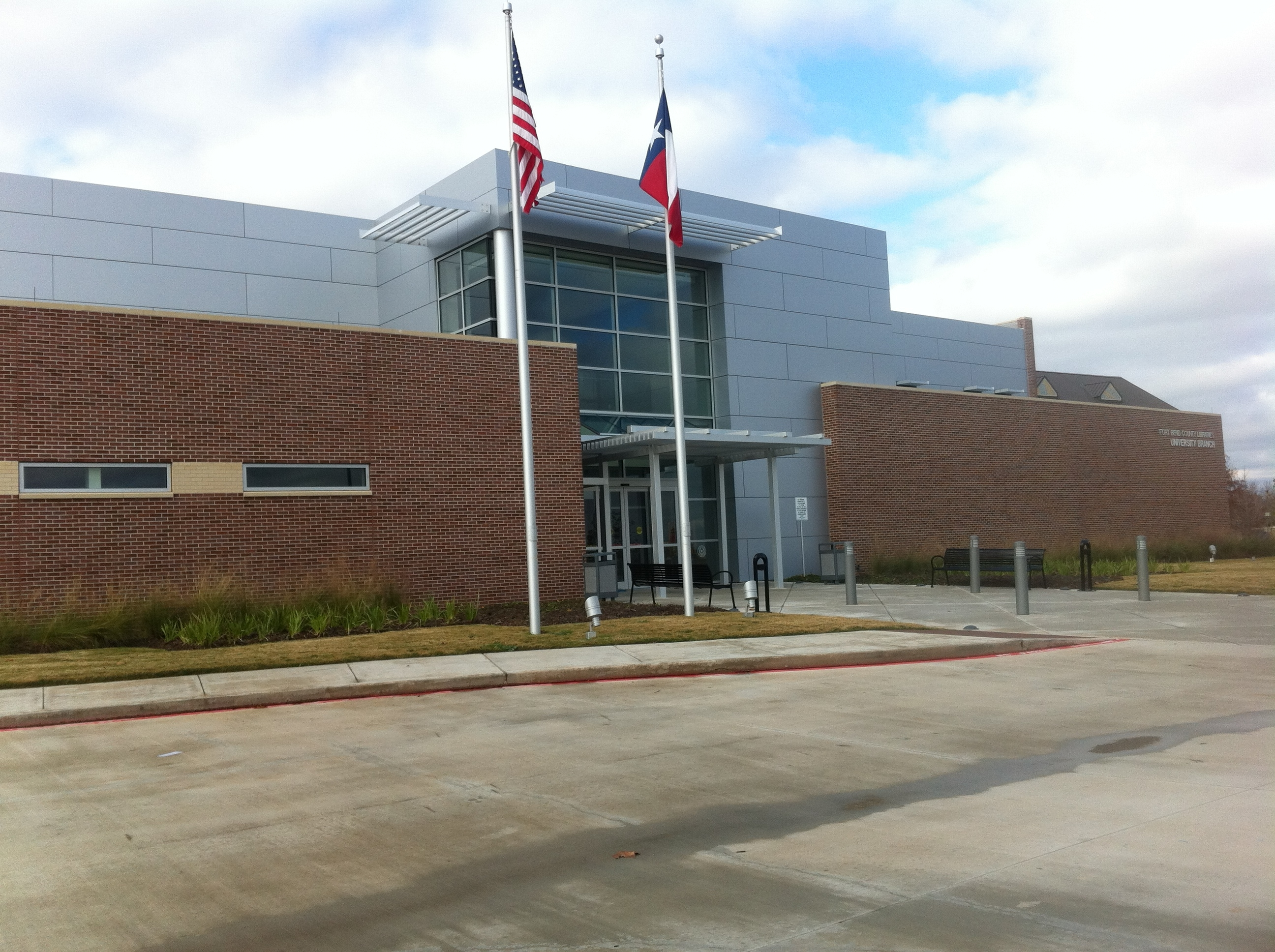
University Branch in Sugar Land

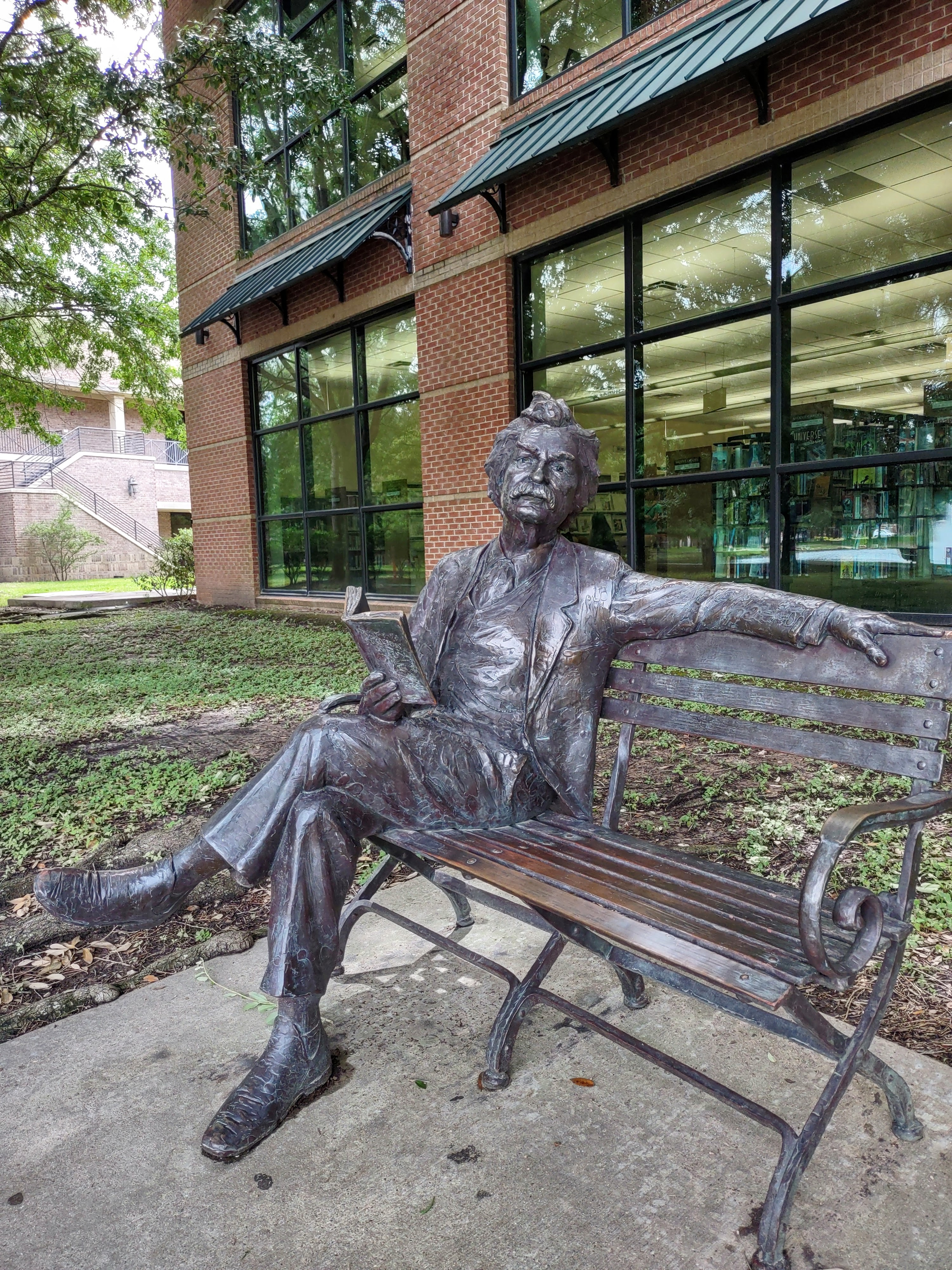
Sculpture of Mark Twain, outside Cinco Ranch branch
