= Sun & Ski Sports =

Sports company in Texas, United States

- Company type: Subsidiary
- Industry: Retail
- Founded: 1980; 46 years ago
- Founder: Barry Goldware
- Headquarters: Stafford, Texas, United States
- Number of locations: 31 (2022)
- Area served: United States
- Key people: Barry Goldware (Founder); Steve Rath (Co-Owner); Frank Stanley (Co-Owner); Karl Salz (President)
- Products: Sporting Goods and Outdoor Gear
- Parent: Retail Concepts, Inc.
- Website: www.sunandski.com

Sun & Ski Sports is a United States–based specialty sporting goods retail company headquartered in Stafford, Texas. Established in 1980, Sun & Ski Sports has 32 stores across 12 American states. They offer a wide variety of products but specialize in skiing, snowboarding, cycling, hiking, running gear, and watersports.

== History ==
Sun & Ski Sports started as Tennis and Ski Warehouse in the Midwest United States by Barry Goldware.

In 2012, Sun & Ski Sports changed ownership. Frank Stanley and Steve Rath both became Co-CEO's, while Karl Salz joined as president.

In 2020, leadership decided to give an "appreciation bonus" for all of its corporate, distribution center, and retail store employees in recognition of their work during the COVID 19 pandemic.

== Locations ==
As of 2022, Sun & Ski Sports operates out of 32 locations across the United States. Their headquarters is in Stafford, Texas, right outside of Houston. In Texas, they have locations in Austin, Dallas, Fort Worth, Houston, McAllen, and San Antonio.

Outside of Texas, Sun & Ski Sports has locations in California, Colorado, Maryland, Massachusetts, New Hampshire, New York, North Carolina, Oklahoma, Tennessee, Utah, Arizona, and Virginia. Some locations, such as California, Colorado, and Utah, are situated near mountain resorts.

== Products ==
The retailer offers gear – including apparel, footwear, electronic equipment and more – for the following categories:snow sports, water sports, running, cycling, and hiking.

Sun & Ski Sports carries a wide range of products from apparel, footwear, accessories, and technical gear such as skis, snowboards, and bikes. They offer brands such as Patagonia, Columbia, The North Face, Spyder, Cannondale, Burton, Rossignol, Salomon, Hoka, On, Garmin, Billabong, and more.
