= Katy, Texas =

City in Texas, United States

- City
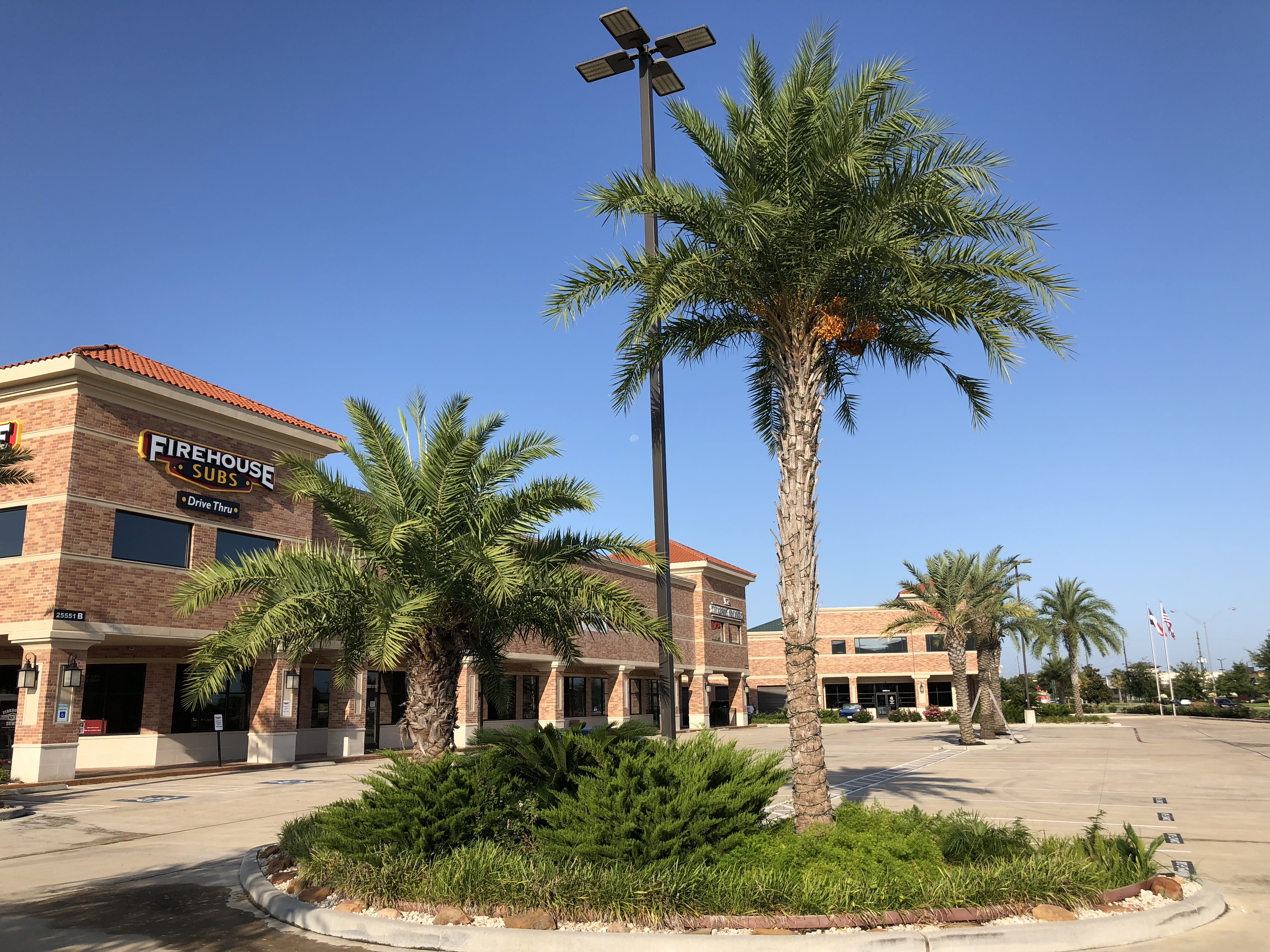
- Kingsland Boulevard

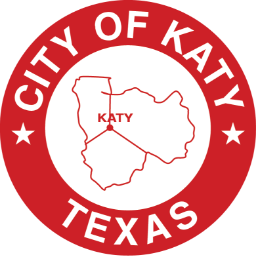
- Seal
- Motto: "Small Town Charm with Big City Convenience"
- Interactive map of Katy, Texas
- Location within Texas Location within the United States
- Coordinates: 29°47′8.83″N 95°49′27.82″W
- Country: United States
- State: Texas
- Counties: Harris, Fort Bend, Waller
- Founded: 1896
- Incorporated: 1945

Government
  - Mayor: William H. Thiele
  - Mayor Pro Tem: Chris Harris
  - Council members: Janet Corte; Dan Smith; Rory A. Robertson; Gina Hicks

Area
  - Total: 15.312 sq mi (39.658 km^{2})
  - Land: 15.294 sq mi (39.610 km^{2})
  - Water: 0.018 sq mi (0.047 km^{2})
- Elevation: 138 ft (42 m)

Population (2020)
  - Total: 21,894
  - Estimate (2025): 28,373
  - Density: 1,755.7/sq mi (677.89/km^{2})
- Demonym: Katyite
- Time zone: UTC–6 (Central (CST))
  - Summer (DST): UTC–5 (CDT)
- ZIP Codes: 77449, 77450, 77491, 77492, 77493, 77494
- Area codes: 713, 281, 832, 346, 621
- FIPS code: 48-38476
- GNIS feature ID: 1338960
- Sales tax: 8.25%
- Website: cityofkaty.com

Katy is a city in the U.S. state of Texas, approximately centered at the tripoint of Harris, Fort Bend, and Waller counties. The population was 21,894 at the 2020 census. It is the center of the urban Greater Katy area, itself forming the western part of the Greater Houston metropolitan area.

First formally settled in the mid-1890s, Katy was a railroad town along the Missouri–Kansas–Texas (MKT) Railroad which ran parallel to U.S. Route 90 (today Interstate 10) into downtown Houston. Katy obtained its name when the MKT Railroad dropped its Missouri waypoint and the junction became known as the "KT stop". The fertile floodplain of Buffalo Bayou, which has its source near Katy, and its tributaries made the city and other communities in the surrounding prairie an attractive location for rice farming. Beginning in the 1960s, the rapid growth of Houston moved westward along the new Interstate 10 corridor, bringing Katy into its environs.

Today, Katy lies at the center of a broader area known as Greater Katy, which has become heavily urbanized. Homes and businesses may have Katy postal addresses without being in the city limits. While largely subsumed into Greater Houston, the town of Katy is still notable for Katy Mills Mall, Katy High School and its football dominance , and the historic Katy town square along the former right-of-way of the MKT railroad.

== History ==
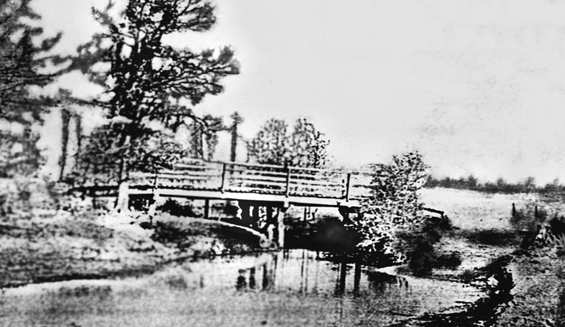
First bridge over Cane Island Creek, circa 1895

The City of Katy sits on Karankawa tribal lands. European colonists' first record of contact with a tribe is in 1528. Over the next 250 years the area was trafficked by French and Spanish European colonists seeking land and trade opportunities. By 1779, the Karankawa were at war with Spanish settlers. In 1790 the war ended and shortly after settlement begins.

In the early 1800s Katy came be to be known as "Cane Island", named for the creek that runs through the area, a branch of Buffalo Bayou. The creek was filled with tall cane, not native to the area. It was presumed to have been planted by either the Karankawa Indians or Spanish explorers to aid in fur trapping until the 1820s.

In 1845 James J. Crawford received a land grant that included this area. The hot summers and thick clay soil made it difficult to attract settlers to the area. Freed slaves and their families including Thomas (Mary) Robinson and Milto McGinnis, along with Mr. Crawford, Peter Black, and John Sills were the only recorded residents of Cane Island in 1875.

In 1895, James Oliver Thomas laid out a town, and in January 1896 the town of Katy was named through Thomas's post office application. The name "Katy" was derived from the MKT Railroad Company, which was commonly referred to as "the K-T" (also its stock exchange symbol). This common designation soon evolved into "the Katy", and since the railroad company and its trains held a key depot station located today's city, the general location came to be known as Katy.

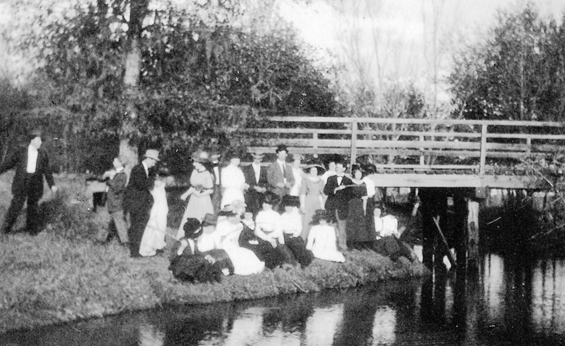
Katy Residents gather for a photo at Cane Island Creek Bridge in 1911.

The anticipations of prosperity would bring growth to the new town which was developed around the original train stop and railroad tracks. By the early 1900s many families had come by train and wagon to establish Katy. Cotton and peanuts and corn were the first successful crops, but rice soon became the primary commodity crop. Katy later became known for rice farming; the first concrete rice driers in the state of Texas were built here in 1944 and still stand as landmarks. The farming community well supported local businesses as several hotels, stores, livery stables and saloons were prospering.

On September 8, 1900, the town's early efforts were swept clean by the Great Galveston Hurricane of 1900, the deadliest hurricane in U.S. history. All but three of the original Katy homes were lost in the storm—The Wright House, The Featherson House, and The Morrison-Freeman House. Despite this, three major homes were built in the immediate aftermath of the hurricane and another six more over the following decade. Cane Island was rebuilt quickly and continued to grow.

The City was once known as the "City of Churches" due to the role of religion in daily life. Not only were churches highly concentrated in the city, but according to area historian Carol Adams, the residents had a fervent religious belief. Circa the 1900s the city erected a "City of Churches" sign.

Humble Oil opened the Katy Gas Field in 1943, which went on to become one of the principal suppliers of allied forces and eventually became one of the most productive gas fields in the State of Texas. Today, what was Humble Oil is now Exxon which continues to operate and oversee the expansive underground pipeline network in the region.

In 1945 the City of Katy was incorporated. C. L. Baird was the first mayor. The city's limits were determined by finding the area that contained the most residents and was reasonably sized so that it could be managed by city services.

The construction and opening of Interstate 10 in 1966 allowed for rapid development of the area, as Houston expanded westward. Large sections of the K-T railway were removed to allow for the I-10 expansion, officially marking the end of passenger rail through the region. I-10 was widened further in 2008 to 14 lanes with TXDOT plans for additional widening forthcoming.

== Geography ==
The City of Katy is located at the three-border junction of Harris, Fort Bend, and Waller counties, along Interstate 10, 29 miles (47 km) west of downtown Houston and 22 miles (35 km) east of Sealy. According to the United States Census Bureau, the city has a total area of 15.312 square miles (39.66 km^{2}), of which 15.294 square miles (39.61 km^{2}) is land and 0.018 square miles (0.05 km^{2}) is water.

Katy is often further defined as either "Old Towne Katy" or "Greater Katy". Old Towne Katy refers to the portion of Katy that was incorporated in 1945. Its boundaries, as defined by the Katy Independent School Divisions zoning, run just south of Kingsland Blvd, stretching across Interstate 10 to Morton Road. Katy Fort Bend Road and Cane Island Creek act as the east and west boundaries, The Greater Katy area includes the city of Katy plus large sections of unincorporated land surrounding the city corresponding to the boundaries of the 181 sq mi (470 km^{2}) Katy Independent School District.

Greater Katy includes communities such as Cinco Ranch, Green Trails, Grayson Lakes, Seven Meadows, Pine Mill Ranch, Silver Ranch, Firethorne, Grand Lakes, and Young Ranch. It also encompasses suburban developments from the 1970s and 1980s, such as Memorial Parkway, Kelliwood and Nottingham Country.

Old Towne Katy's new residential communities include Pin Oak Village, The Falls at Green Meadows, Cane Island and The Enclave. Large developments underway have included new residential communities boarding the east border of Mary Joe Peckham Park and the Katy Boardwalk. The City of Katy's government has also placed a large focus on the downtown redevelopment plan which included the new city hall building and an upcoming downtown green space. Further projects included Typhoon Texas Water Park, Katy Independent School District's Legacy Football Stadium, Katy Independent School District's Rhodes Stadium, Momentum Indoor Climbing Center, REI Climb Store and the YMCA at Katy Main Street.

The City of Houston's extraterritorial jurisdiction stretches well west of Katy. This means that a few unincorporated lands in the Katy area could be annexed by the City of Houston at some time in the future, though it is unlikely since Houston is unable to provide basic services to these isolated areas. The city of Katy's extraterritorial jurisdiction, meanwhile, is limited to parcels of land west and north of the city itself.

=== Climate ===
The climate in this area is characterized by hot, humid summers and generally mild to cool winters. According to the Köppen climate classification system, Katy has a humid subtropical climate, abbreviated "Cfa" on climate maps. The area is located in the Western Gulf Coastal Grasslands, or the coastal prairie.

== Demographics ==
As of the 2025 ACS, the City of Katy has an estimated population of 25,184, with a median age of 38 years old. Just over half the resident population (52%) has a bachelor's degree, and the majority of workers between 25-44 years of age work from home despite the car-dependent infrastructure.

Historical population
Census	Pop.	Note	%±
1950	849		—
1960	1,569		84.8%
1970	2,923		86.3%
1980	5,660		93.6%
1990	8,005		41.4%
2000	11,775		47.1%
2010	14,102		19.8%
2020	21,894		55.3%
2025 (est.)	28,373		29.6%
U.S. Decennial Census; Texas Almanac: 1850-2000; 2020 Census

=== Racial and ethnic composition ===
Katy city, Texas – Racial and ethnic composition Note: the US Census treats Hispanic/Latino as an ethnic category. This table excludes Latinos from the racial categories and assigns them to a separate category. Hispanics/Latinos may be of any race.
Race / Ethnicity (NH = Non-Hispanic)	Pop 2000	Pop 2010	Pop 2020	% 2000	% 2010	% 2020
White alone (NH)	8,275	8,854	11,652	70.28%	62.79%	53.22%
Black or African American alone (NH)	488	713	1,455	4.14%	5.06%	6.65%
Native American or Alaska Native alone (NH)	37	36	51	0.31%	0.26%	0.23%
Asian alone (NH)	58	207	1,687	0.49%	1.47%	7.71%
Native Hawaiian or Pacific Islander alone (NH)	2	0	12	0.02%	0.00%	0.05%
Other race alone (NH)	12	23	99	0.10%	0.16%	0.45%
Mixed race or Multiracial (NH)	106	177	797	0.90%	1.26%	3.64%
Hispanic or Latino (any race)	2,797	4,092	6,141	23.75%	29.02%	28.05%
Total	11,775	14,102	21,894	100.00%	100.00%	100.00%

=== 2020 census ===
As of the 2020 census, there were 21,894 people, 7,199 households, and 5,804 families residing in the city. The median age was 37.3 years, with 27.3% of residents under the age of 18 and 13.3% 65 years of age or older. For every 100 females there were 96.5 males, and for every 100 females age 18 and over there were 93.0 males age 18 and over.

There were 7,199 households in Katy, of which 45.2% had children under the age of 18 living in them. Of all households, 64.7% were married-couple households, 11.4% were households with a male householder and no spouse or partner present, and 19.5% were households with a female householder and no spouse or partner present. About 15.0% of all households were made up of individuals and 7.2% had someone living alone who was 65 years of age or older.

The population density was 1,505.4 inhabitants per square mile (581.2/km^{2}), and there were 7,563 housing units, of which 4.8% were vacant. The homeowner vacancy rate was 2.4% and the rental vacancy rate was 6.0%.

99.7% of residents lived in urban areas, while 0.3% lived in rural areas.

=== Religion ===
Places of worship in the modern-day Katy area represent non-denominations as well as the denominations of Catholicism, Islam, Latter-Day Saints, Judaism, Hinduism, and Protestantism.

== Economy ==
Several corporations are headquartered in areas surrounding Katy.

Igloo Corporation is headquartered west of Katy in unincorporated Waller County. Academy Sports and Outdoors has its corporate offices and product distribution center in unincorporated western Harris County.

BP America is headquartered in the Houston Energy Corridor and is the area's largest employer, with 5,500 employees on its Westlake campus as of 2009. BP's Katy operations include engineering and business support for much of BP's onshore operations in the contiguous United States, as well as its operations in the Gulf of Mexico.

In 2017, Amazon constructed a 1 million-square-foot distribution center near the intersection of Highway 90 and Woods Road. In 2021, it was estimated that new development projects were near completion to stimulate the local economy.

With the economy improving after 2009, retail centers were developed throughout Katy to accommodate the rapid residential growth. The major retail growth is taking place along Katy Fort Bend Road near the east entrance to the Katy Mills shopping mall. In August 2010, H-E-B Food & Drug opened a new store at I-10 and Pin Oak. In July 2013, Costco announced that it would open a store at the southwest corner of Grand Parkway and I-10 in 2014. Construction began in August 2013. The new store was planned for completion by early spring 2014 and would be Costco's fourth Houston-area location.

In September 2018, Katy Asian Town, in proximity to the City of Katy, was established. This multicultural dining, shopping and residential area is anchored by Asian grocer, HMart and Japanese book retailer Kinokuniya. Cultural activities held in Katy Asian Town include Chinese New Year with lion dancing performances, as well as open market art and comics events outside Kinokuniya. Katy Asian Town is also home to the Andretti Indoor Karting and Games facility, featuring kart racing, video gaming, virtual reality attractions and dining.

The Katy Area Economic Development Council serves as the economic development organization for the area. Founded in 2003, the Katy Area Economic Development Council's (Katy Area EDC) mission is to establish the Katy area as the premier location for families and businesses through planned economic growth and economic development. Since its inception, the Katy Area EDC has grown to over 210 members, has a budget of $900,000 and has assisted in the creation of over 16,200 jobs and more than $2.5 billion in capital investment. Katy Area EDC is a full-service private, non-profit, 501 (c) 6 economic development corporation.

== Government and infrastructure ==
Katy is a home-rule city, chartered in 1945. Residents within the city limits are governed by a nonpartisan city council made up of five council members and the mayor. The mayor is William H. Thiele. The city is split into two wards; two council members are elected from each ward, and one council member and the mayor are elected at-large. The mayor appoints a council member to serve as mayor pro tempore with a council vote of approval.

Residents within the city limits pay city taxes and receive municipal police, fire, EMS, and public works service. The city has territory in three counties, each of which has its own representative governments. The counties have a greater influence on area outside the incorporated city limits.

The Katy area lies in three counties. Residents in unincorporated Harris, Fort Bend and Waller counties are governed by those counties. The county residents elect representative county commissioners who represent them on the county courts of each county, presided over by the county judge of each county.

Harris County Precinct Three, headed by Tom Ramsey as of 2021, serves the Harris County portion of Katy. The Fort Bend County portion of Katy is under Fort Bend County Precinct Three headed by Andy Meyers.

Harris Health System (Harris County's hospital district) operates the Danny Jackson Health Center in the Bear Hunter Plaza in a nearby area of Harris County. Fort Bend County does not have a hospital district. OakBend Medical Center serves as the county's charity hospital which the county contracts with.

The city's rapid growth has led to service issues related to capacity and changing resident needs. Some intersections are over-trafficked taking multiple cycles to get thru, and a lack of site development standards and adequate development impacts fees has led to a fragmented or non-existent sidewalk network or alternative mobility network. The City Council is working diligently to address these issues by addressing light timing, introducing light meters at I-10 and SH 99 on ramps and the Cane Island roundabout, as well as updating site development standards to ensure the provision of sidewalks and adequate trip generation analysis, as well as adjust development impact fees to ensure development serves the community and pays its fair share.

== Education ==
=== Primary and secondary schools ===
People who live in Katy are zoned to schools in the Katy Independent School District. While multiple Katy ISD schools have "Katy, Texas" postal addresses, only a portion are located in and/or serve the Katy city limits.

==== Elementary schools ====
- Zelma Hutsell Elementary School
- Katy Elementary School
- WoodCreek Elementary School
- Bryant Elementary School
- Robertson Elementary School
- Maydell Jenks Elementary School
- Bonnie Holland Elementary School
- Keiko Davidson Elementary School
- Cloob Doober Elementary School

==== Middle schools ====
- Katy Junior High School
- WoodCreek Junior High School
- Seven Lakes Junior Hugh School
- Beckendorff Junior High School
- Tays Junior High School

==== High schools ====
- Katy High School, the oldest high school, is located nearest to the center city. It was established in 1898, and relocated to its present location in 1947. Katy ISD's three alternative education schools (Martha Raines High School, Miller Career and Technology Center, and the Opportunity Awareness Center) are all located within the city.
- Morton Ranch High School
- Cinco Ranch High School
- James E. Taylor High School
- Obra D. Tompkins High School
- Jordan High School
- Freeman High School
- Mayde Creek High School
- Patricia E. Paetow High School

==== Charter schools ====
The following schools operate outside of Katy ISD's jurisdiction:

- Aristoi Classical Academy is a K-12 charter school in Katy.

==== Private schools ====
- Mirus Academy is an independent school in the city center, serving 8th - 12th grades.

The pre-merger Berean Christian Academy started operations in 2016 and held classes at First Baptist Church in the City of Katy. In 2026 it merged with Faith West Academy in Harris County to form the post-merger Berean Christian Academy, with classes at the Faith West building.

=== Colleges ===
Katy ISD (and therefore the City of Katy) is served by the Houston Community College System. HCC Northwest College operates the Katy Campus in an unincorporated section of Harris County.

The University of Houston purchased the Verde Park Development site, with plans to break ground on a Katy Campus at I10 and 99. Its construction was completed in 2019.

=== Public libraries ===
Katy is served by the Katy Branch of Harris County Public Library (HCPL) at 5414 Franz Road. The branch is a partnership between HCPL and the City of Katy. The city joined the county library system in 1921. The Katy Garden Club started the first library, which was housed in several private houses. At a later point it shared space with the Katy Fire Department. The first Katy branch opened in 1940. The Friends of the Katy Library began in 1972. The construction of the current 15,000-square-foot (1,400 m^{2}) branch began in 2002. The current branch building opened for regular business in Monday April 28, 2003, with its grand opening ceremony on the previous day.

== Parks and recreation ==
- Harris County operates the Mary Jo Peckham Community Center at 5597 Gardenia Lane, Katy, Texas 77493.
- The City of Katy Dog Park is located at 5414 Franz Road.
- The annual Katy Rice Harvest Festival is two days of live entertainment, craft and food booths and a carnival.

== Transportation ==
=== Mass transit ===
Metropolitan Transit Authority of Harris County (METRO) operates the Kingsland Park and Ride (Route 221) east of Katy at 21669 Kingsland Boulevard. In February 2008 METRO opened a new park and ride location at the Cinemark parking lots near the intersection of Grand Parkway and I-10. The new Route is #222. Currently, only these express routes operate to and from downtown Houston during morning and evening commute hours.

METRO opened a six-story garage Park And Ride Bus Depot at the intersection of I-10 west and the Grand Parkway to service commuters.

=== Intercity buses ===
Greyhound Bus Lines operates the Katy Station at Millers Exxon. Megabus.com stops at Katy Mills en route between Austin, San Antonio, and Houston. This serves as a park-and-ride location for riders from the Katy and Greater Houston area.

=== Airports ===
Privately owned airports for fixed-wing aircraft for public use located near Katy include:

- Houston Executive Airport in unincorporated Waller County
- West Houston Airport in unincorporated Harris County

Privately owned airports for private use include:

- Hoffpauir Airport in unincorporated Harris County
- Cardiff Brothers Airport in unincorporated Fort Bend County

Area airports with commercial airline service include George Bush Intercontinental Airport and William P. Hobby Airport, both of which are in Houston.

== Notable people ==
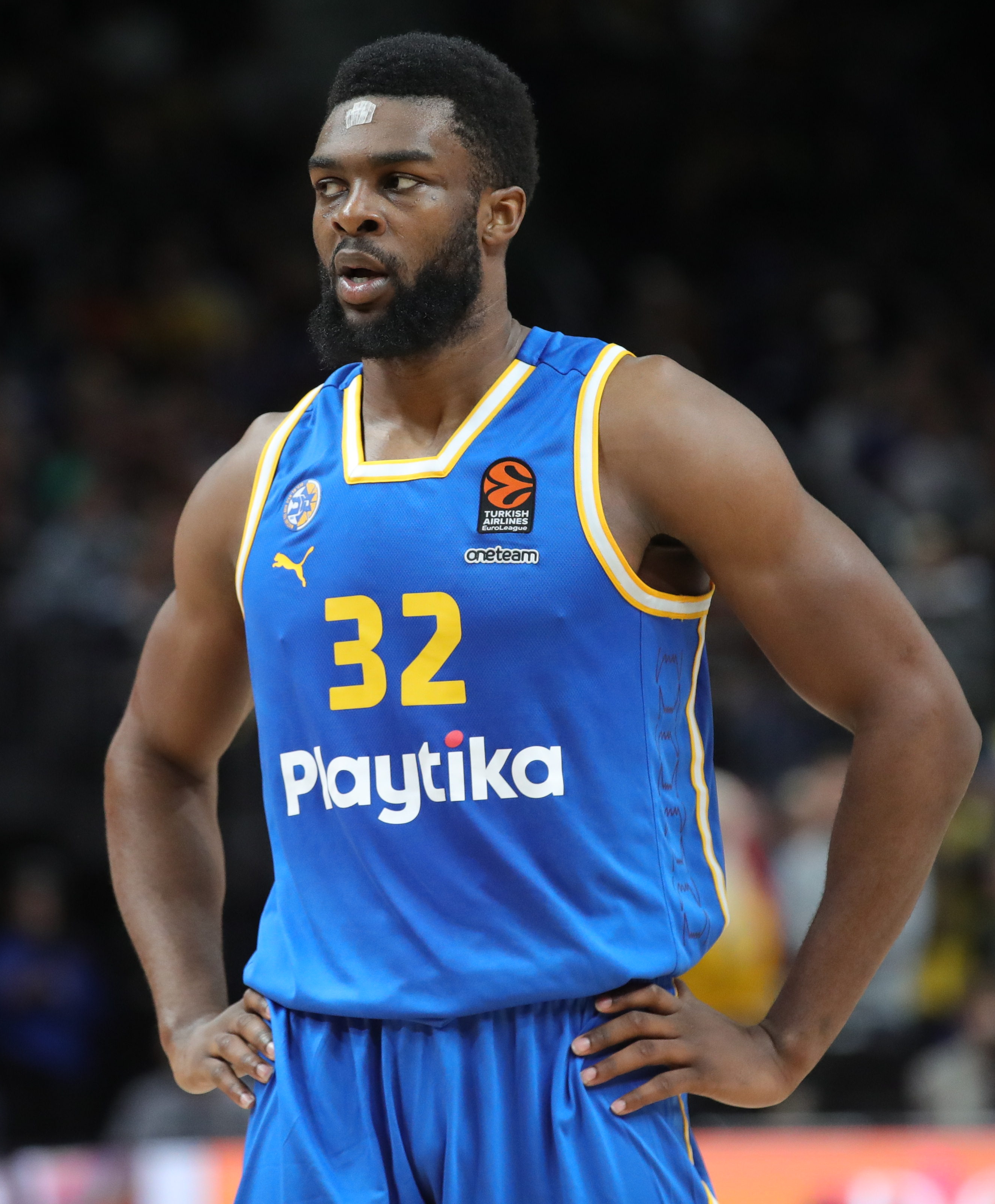
Josh Nebo

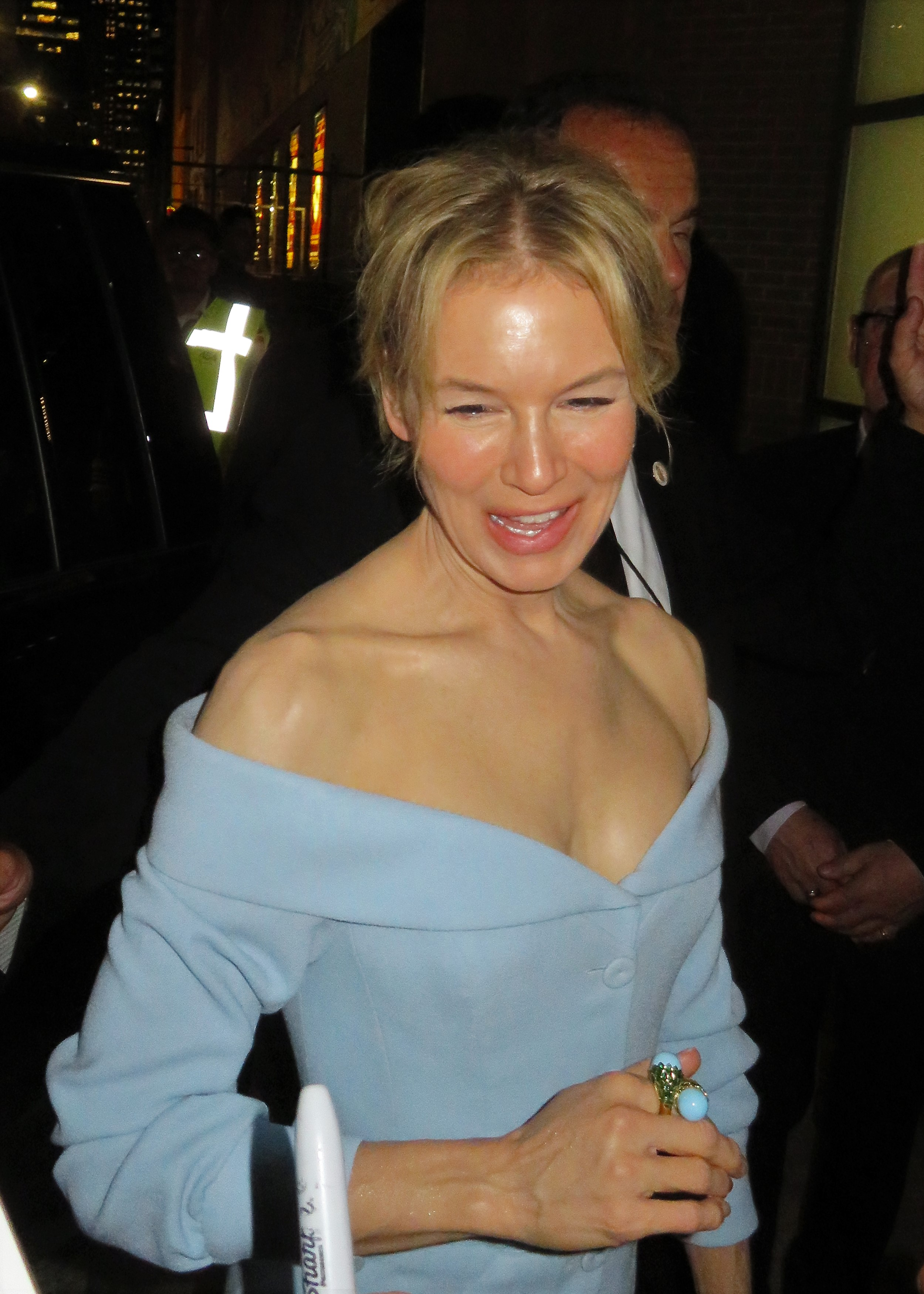
Renée Zellweger

- Rodney Anderson, former NFL running back
- Tajh Bellow, actor
- Clint Black, country singer and musician
- Kimberly Caldwell, American Idol contestant, singer, actress, television hostess
- Bill Callegari, businessman, engineer, and a Republican member of the Texas House of Representatives from Katy from 2001 to 2015
- Christian Cappis, soccer player who represented the United States at a youth level
- The Catt family, 21st-century bank robbing family
- Roger Creager, Texas country singer and songwriter
- Dan Crenshaw, Texas Representative
- Andy Dalton, quarterback in the NFL for six different teams, most notably for the Cincinnati Bengals
- Bernice Edwards, classic female blues singer, pianist and songwriter
- Paddy Fisher, college football player
- Courtney Ford, actress
- De'Aaron Fox, professional basketball player for the San Antonio Spurs in the NBA and McDonald's All American
- Janeane Garofalo, actress, stand-up comedian, and writer
- Cullen Gillaspia, Houston Texans fullback in the NFL
- Sammy Guevara, Professional Wrestler from AEW
- Julie Henderson, model
- Jalen Milroe, quarterback for the Seattle Seahawks
- Bo Levi Mitchell, professional quarterback currently playing for the Hamilton Tiger-Cats in the Canadian Football League, 2014 and 2018 Grey Cup MVP
- Tyler Myers, pro hockey player for the Vancouver Canucks in the National Hockey League
- Josh Nebo (born 1997), basketball player for Maccabi Tel Aviv of the Israeli Premier Basketball League
- Megan Nicole, singer
- Sage Northcutt, UFC fighter
- Renee O'Connor, actress and director, best known for her role as Gabrielle in Xena: Warrior Princess
- Pamela Ribon, screenwriter, novelist, and actress
- Horst Christian Simco, better known as RiFF Raff, a professional rapper
- Madisen Skinner, professional volleyball player and member of the US women's national volleyball team
- Jesse Sorensen, professional wrestler
- Ty Tabor, guitarist and vocalist of melodic progressive metal band King's X
- Brett Velicovich, soldier
- Masyn Winn, MLB player for the St. Louis Cardinals
- Renée Zellweger, actress and producer
- Jace LaViolette, MLB player for the Cleveland Guardians

== See also ==
The MKT Depot
