= Katy Mills =

Shopping mall in Fort Bend County, Texas, U.S.

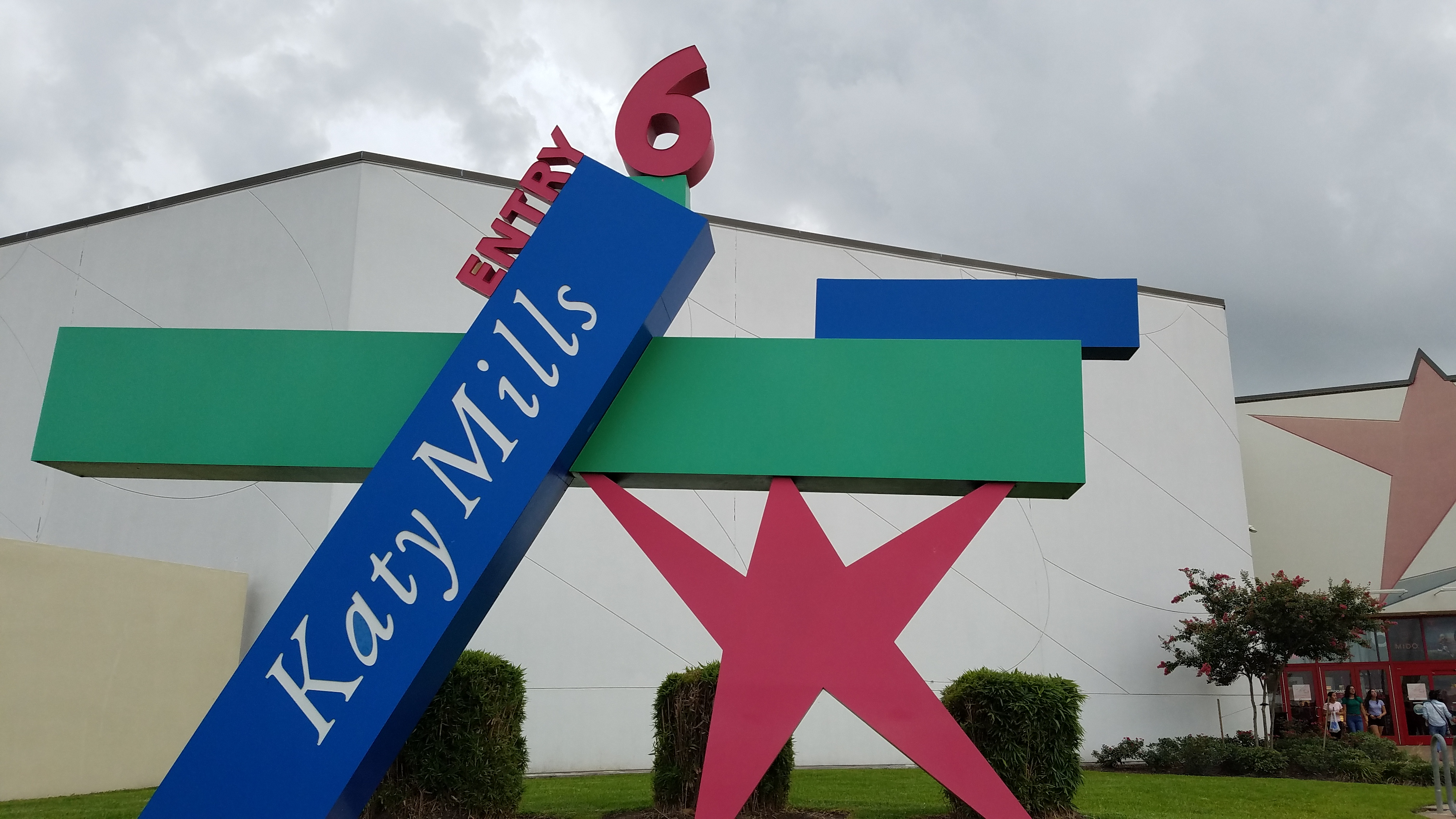
- Entrance sign in June 2019, very close to when Simon removed it during renovations
- Location: Katy, Texas, U.S.
- Coordinates: 29°46′32.38″N 95°48′33.67″W
- Opened: October 28, 1999; 27 years ago
- Renovated: 2018–2020
- Developer: The Mills Corporation; KanAm Group
- Manager: Simon Premium Outlets; The Mills: A Simon Company
- Owner: Simon Property Group (62.5%); KanAm Group (37.5%)
- Architect: RTKL Associates
- Num. of stores: 170+ (at peak)
- Num. of anchor tenants: 17 (at peak)
- Floor area: 1,201,104 square feet (111,586.2 m^{2})
- Floors: 1
- Website: www.simon.com/mall/katy-mills

Katy Mills is a super-regional outlet mall in Katy, Texas, within Greater Houston. It was primarily developed by the Mills Corporation and managed by Simon Property Group as of April 2007, which owns 62.5% of it. The remaining shares are handled by the German-based KanAm Group.

The mall had its grand opening on October 28, 1999. and included over 170 stores at its peak. Katy Mills has ≈1,300,000 square feet (120,000 m^{2}) of retail space.

== History ==
=== 1997–1999: Planning and construction ===
In 1997, the Arlington, Virginia-based Mills Corporation had negotiations to build a mall in Katy, Texas. This would be the second mall they would build in Texas, after Grapevine Mills in Tarrant County opened in late October of that year. The original project was to be located on a 727-acre (294 ha) site that was owned by Interfin Corporation and located between the Grand Parkway Mason Road. Later, Mills changed plans and instead leased land from Dallas-based American Realty Trust. The site from American Realty Trust, at the size of 500 acres (200 ha), was located near Pin Oak Road and Interstate 10. Mills later purchased the 500-acre (200 ha) site in February 1998, and construction began on the mall, along with German-based KanAm, RTKL Associates, Greg Rose Design, JK Design Group, Creative Artisans Group, Penwal, Texas Bomanite, and the American Institute of Steel Construction.

The Mills Corp. allowed several anchors to open in the mall, such as a 20-screen AMC Theatres, Virgin Megastore, Off Rodeo Drive Beverly Hills, Boot Town, Books-A-Million, Rainforest Cafe, Marshalls, Bass Pro Shops Outdoor World, Old Navy, and GameWorks. In early 1999, plans changed for the opening of Katy Mills, as GameWorks and Virgin Megastore would not open, and instead Jillian's and FYE (For Your Entertainment) would open. It was also announced that Bed Bath & Beyond, Burlington Coat Factory, and a Benetton Sportsystem store would open at the mall, marking the first time Benetton would go in the retail business. Marshalls later pulled out and Funkyard would take its space. A couple months later, Katy Mills announced that they would open Saks Off 5th and Sun & Ski Sports, and as the opening drew closer, Off Rodeo Drive Beverly Hills would open a sports bar concept "Starflight Cafe" in the mall. It was also announced that Boot Town had leased a western-themed outlet titled "Old West Warehouse". Other tenants, such as the now-defunct NASCAR Silicon Motor Speedway, Big Dog Sportswear, Skechers USA, Bose Factory Store, Brooks Brothers Factory Store, Carter's for Kids, Kenneth Cole New York, the Official Dallas Cowboys Pro Shop, Mikasa Factory Store, and Samsonite Company Store have also been added to their lineup. Construction was completed in October 1999, and the mall was ready to open. The Mills Corp. promoted the mall by releasing various print ads in newspapers, and television commercials.

=== 1999–2006: Grand opening and early years ===
Katy Mills officially opened on October 28, 1999, with a ribbon-cutting ceremony. The first 5,000 shoppers that came to the mall earned one of ten $1,000 shopping sprees and other prizes. Various celebrities came to visit the mall, such as the Miss Texas pageant, former WNBA player Tina Thompson and former NFL defense tackler Ray Childress. One hour before the ribbon-cutting ceremony and 30 minutes after the mall opened, the Aggie Wranglers performed in the Food Court at 8:30 AM. Following the opening of the stores, the Houston Firefighters had a “Men of the Millennium” fashion show. People were eligible to register to win a 1999 Chrysler Sebring Convertible. At 7:30 p.m. EDT, Joyce Cooling had a concert in the food court. The concert was sponsored by Houston radio station, KODA. When the mall opened, it had 91.2% occupancy.

==== Design and architecture ====
As typical with Landmark Mills malls, Katy Mills was heavily themed, as there were bright colors throughout. The mall's mascots were a family of sentient stars. The mall had a racetrack design and was split into seven neighborhoods, each with its own combination of colors, sculptures, patterns, sounds and lighting. The food court in the center named Katy Field Day was themed around an athletic field, with a scoreboard showing the current time and the decorations featuring the stars playing sports games. The mall was "the newest star in Texas", and "With Katy Mills in the area, shopping in Texas will never be the same again". The mall also had several TVs hanging from the ceiling of the mall that played music videos and other content.

In 2000, more stores opened, such as Polo Ralph Lauren, which replaced EUROKIDS Designer Boutique and the planned Marshalls, which replaced Funkyard. Verizon was also opened. Benetton Sportsystem closed at an unknown time. New stores debuted in 2003, including Diamonds and More Diamond Outlet, Nextel Wireless, Suit Warehouse, Nine West and Perfumes Unlimited. BCBG Max Azria was also closed. In July 2004, it was announced that Neiman Marcus Last Call Clearance Center would open at the mall. Mall map issues presented the store as a non-anchor. This issue was fixed in later mall maps released by Simon. This also marked the debut of Go! Calendars Games & Toys, Limited Too, American Eagle Outfitters and Aéropostale. Suit Warehouse was relocated in front of Old West Warehouse, while Jillian's closed on October 10, 2004, after filing for Chapter 11 bankruptcy and selling select locations to Dave & Buster's, which explicitly stated the Katy Mills location would not be converted into a Dave & Buster's.

In October 2005, Bui-Yah-Kah relocated to Neighborhood 7, and Samsonite relocated to a new space near Neighborhood 4. The Nextel Wireless Store was converted to a Sprint store, as a result of Sprint's merger with Nextel. Other stores opened as well, including Lucky Brand Jeans, Famous Footwear, Foot Locker, and Steve & Barry's University Sportswear in the former, 55,000 sq ft (5,100 m^{2}) Jillian's space.. In July 2006, new upscale and designer stores started appearing in the mall. These stores included J. Crew, Anne Klein, Florsheim, and Lane Bryant.

=== 2006–2013: Simon Property Group ===
In mid-2006, Simon Property Group, in a joint venture with Farallon Capital Management, announced that they would be acquiring Katy Mills as part of a buyout of the Mills Corporation, which was financially struggling during that time. The last addition to the mall from the Mills was a children's play area near the movie theater. The play area was sponsored by Team Certified Suzuki.

In August 2007, New York & Company, Juicy Couture, Oakley Vault, Ecko and Zumiez opened. 2008 saw the additions of Kay Jewelers and Gymboree, with the removals of Old West Warehouse and Lucky Brand Jeans. In 2009, Circuit City and Steve & Barry's filed for Chapter 11 bankruptcy (later Chapter 7 for Circuit City), and subsequently liquidated all of their locations, including Katy Mills. An expansion was made in Neighborhood 3, merging Liz Claiborne and Bennetton to become XXI Forever. There were more additions, including Dickies, Papaya, Victoria's Secret, Pink, Calvin Klein, and U.S. Polo Association. Kirkland's closed for Papaya. RadioShack relocated for Victoria's Secret. The Athlete's Foot closed for Pink. The removal of Anne Klein saw the return of BCBGMAXAZRIA Final Cut. Gaughty Girlz and Sleep Number also closed. Limited Too also became Justice. For a brief moment, Katy Mills had a Halloween exhibit called Katy Haunted House - Texas Terror.

The following year in February 2011, various elements from the old design were removed. New restaurants that opened include Villa, Great Wraps, and Charley's Grilled Subs. New stores opened, which were Janie and Jack, Yankee Candle, Clarks, Express, DC Shoes, and Robert Wayne Footwear. Wilson's Leather was relocated near Marshalls in order to make room for Aldo. Near the end of the year, one of the original anchors in the mall, F.Y.E. permanently closed and became Tilt Studio.

=== 2013–2018 ===
In 2013, Don Massey replaced Mace Hirt as general manager who had held the position since the mall first opened. In the same year, new stores opened, such as Ross Dress for Less opening in the former space of Circuit City. More stores such as Crocs, Michael Kors, Jumpstreet and Segway Outback opened. In 2014, Old Navy relocated to the former spaces of Famous Footwear and Mikasa, while its old space became H&M. Perry Ellis once again closed, making it become Vera Bradley Outlet. This was only for a short time, because it was replaced with a new location of Wilson's Leather. Two new shoe stores opened: Shoe Palace and Steve Madden. When Simon unveiled a new logo in 2014, the City of Katy started discussing renovations of the mall. Following the beginning of the discussions, Katy Mills removed more of its interior decor.

From 2015 to 2016, a complicated series of relocations of stores happened. Lane Bryant relocated to Neighborhood 1, and G.H. Bass & Co. relocated to Neighborhood 7 between Pacific Sunwear and Hot Topic. Shortly after Lane Bryant's reopening, Bass relocated yet again to the former space occupied by Lane Bryant. Following the relocation of Bass, Katy Mills tried their first attempt to bring back Go! Calendars Games & Toys in the former space of Bass, but it closed in 2016. New stores opened, such as Buckle, Fossil, Kate Spade New York, Jared Vault, Converse and Adidas.

In 2017, DR34M Home Rug and Design briefly opened over Bed Bath & Beyond, as well as new stores opening, including Kipling, Cotton On and Fashion Q. When the end of 2017 neared, Charlotte Russe permanently closed and became Under Armour Factory House, and Reebok was relocated to the former space of Kenneth Cole. Restoration Hardware opened at the mall in October 2017.

=== 2018–2019: Interior renovation ===
In January 2018, James Ross became the new general manager for Katy Mills. After long negotiations, James was ready to take on a project to renovate the mall.

The announcement was held on March 8, 2018. The renovation would bring a new color palette, new LED lighting, new flooring, redesigning seating areas, new signage, a fully redesigned food court, and a Disney Junior Play Zone.

The interior renovation was officially completed in February 2019, which removed or painted over the mall's themed neighborhoods in favor of contemporary neighborhoods. Aside from the completion of the renovation, more stores opened up, such as Helzberg Diamonds, BoxLunch, and Champs Sports. It also marked the return of Windsor and Dickies. Three companies that suffered from bankruptcy closed, which were Gymboree, Payless, and Dressbarn. Jumpstreet and Segway Outback were also closed. Kay Jewelers and Fashion Q was also closed. Following the completion of the interior, the exterior's renovations would begin, which would include continuing to remove the mall's sentient star decorations.

=== 2020–present ===
Katy Mills temporarily closed on March 18, 2020, alongside other Simon malls in the U.S., due to the COVID-19 pandemic. Simon added special signage to keep shoppers safe. Most of its original stores closed permanently, such as Naturalizer and Great American Cookies. Most other stores also went out of business, such as Lane Bryant, Justice, New York and Company, Wilson's Leather, Bass, Motherhood Maternity, A'Gaci, and Last Call. Kipling and MasterCuts closed in 2022, while new tenants debuted at the mall in September of that year, such as The Cheesecake Factory, Pandora, Aerie, Miniso, Dig World, Lee Wrangler, and Kilwin's, Chocolate & Ice Cream. This also marked the return of Great American Cookies and Lucky Brand Jeans. June 2023 saw the additions of Puma, Slick City Action Park in October 2023, and Sephora, along with the renovation of Adidas.

August to October 2024 came with major changes, such as the closure of Tommy Bahama's, Ferso's Traditional Mexican Cuisine, Restoration Hardware, and the announcement of Primark opening the following year., along with other new stores. Following the announcement, BoxLunch moved to the space formerly occupied by Bath & Body Works. It was also announced that Rainforest Cafe would undergo an Aztec-focused renovation starting October. Rainforest Cafe had completed its renovation by April 2025.

September 2025 saw new stores, such as La Michoacana and Vineyard Vines.

==== 2025 food court fire ====
On December 20, 2025, a fire broke out in the food court around 2:20 p.m. EST, causing most of the mall to be evacuated and temporarily closed. Shortly after the fire, some surrounding stores were closed, and access to Entry 2 was prohibited.
