= Bernini (fashion) =

Men's fashion company

- Industry: Men's fashion
- Headquarters: Beverly Hills, California, United States
- Website: https://www.bernini.com/

Bernini is a men's fashion company based in Beverly Hills that was popularized in the 1990s and expanded rapidly into multiple stores. The clothing was sold out of a boutique store on Rodeo Drive before adding multiple locations there and elsewhere. Bernini's stores were known as offering "the very best menswear", with some branches selling custom-made suits. Pricing for a suit, shirt, and shoes could run into the thousands of dollars.

Visitors to the line's many stores included celebrities like rapper Puff Daddy and basketball player Michael Jordan. Bernini suits were worn on-air by Love Connection television show host Chuck Woolery, who was provided the suits by the company, as noted by the program announcer at the end of each show.

By 1998, Bernini had expanded to three locations on Rodeo Drive, including the original store at 346 N. Rodeo, Bernini Sport at 326 N. Rodeo, and Bernini Couture at 355 N. Rodeo—leading to the facetious observation that Rodeo Drive was "threatening to become 'Bernini Drive'".

The company opened locations in large outlet shopping centers, like in Cabazon, California. In the late 1990s, the company opened "Off Rodeo Drive Beverly Hills" multi-brand superstores inside of Mills Corporation shopping centers, including in Ontario, California (Ontario Mills) and suburban Dallas-Fort Worth (Grapevine Mills). The "Off Rodeo Drive" properties consisted of a corridor replicating the actual Rodeo Drive of Beverly Hills, with separate doorways leading to mini-stores for clothing brands such as Calvin Klein, Donna Karan, Gianni Versace, Hugo Boss, Moschino, Shauna Stein, Giorgio Armani, and Bernini.

As of 2009, Bernini also operated a number of shops in Las Vegas, including a Bernini and "the fancy men's clothing store" Bernini Collections at Caesars Palace Forum shops, a Bernini Couture at Caesars Palace Appian Way shops, and The Bernini Collezioni at the MGM Grand, selling items from other companies including Brioni, Canali, Versace, Hugo Boss, and Zegna.

Bernini's owner is Yousuf Tar, who previously owned a clothing boutique in South Africa and Burton's of Santa Monica.

Tar, a billionaire, has been known in the region for his residence, a Bel Air mansion nicknamed the 'Tar Mahal' or the 'Chateau d'Or', which was nearly purchased by Michael Jackson shortly before the entertainer's death in 2009.

As of 2021, Bernini's owner is billionaire real estate developer Imtiaz Tar alongside Muhammad and Deen Tar, a privately owned multi-million dollar company operating retail shops including at the highest sales per square foot mall in the US, The Forum Shops at Caesars Palace in Las Vegas. Sales include brick and mortar, wholesale, and e-commerce sales at www.bernini.com. Merchandise include Bernini signature products and classic fragrances with outerwear designs from exotic skins including alligator, crocodile, stingray, ostrich, and python ranging from $2000-100,000 USD.
