= The Forum Shops at Caesars =

Shopping mall on the Las Vegas Strip

The Forum Shops at Caesars Palace

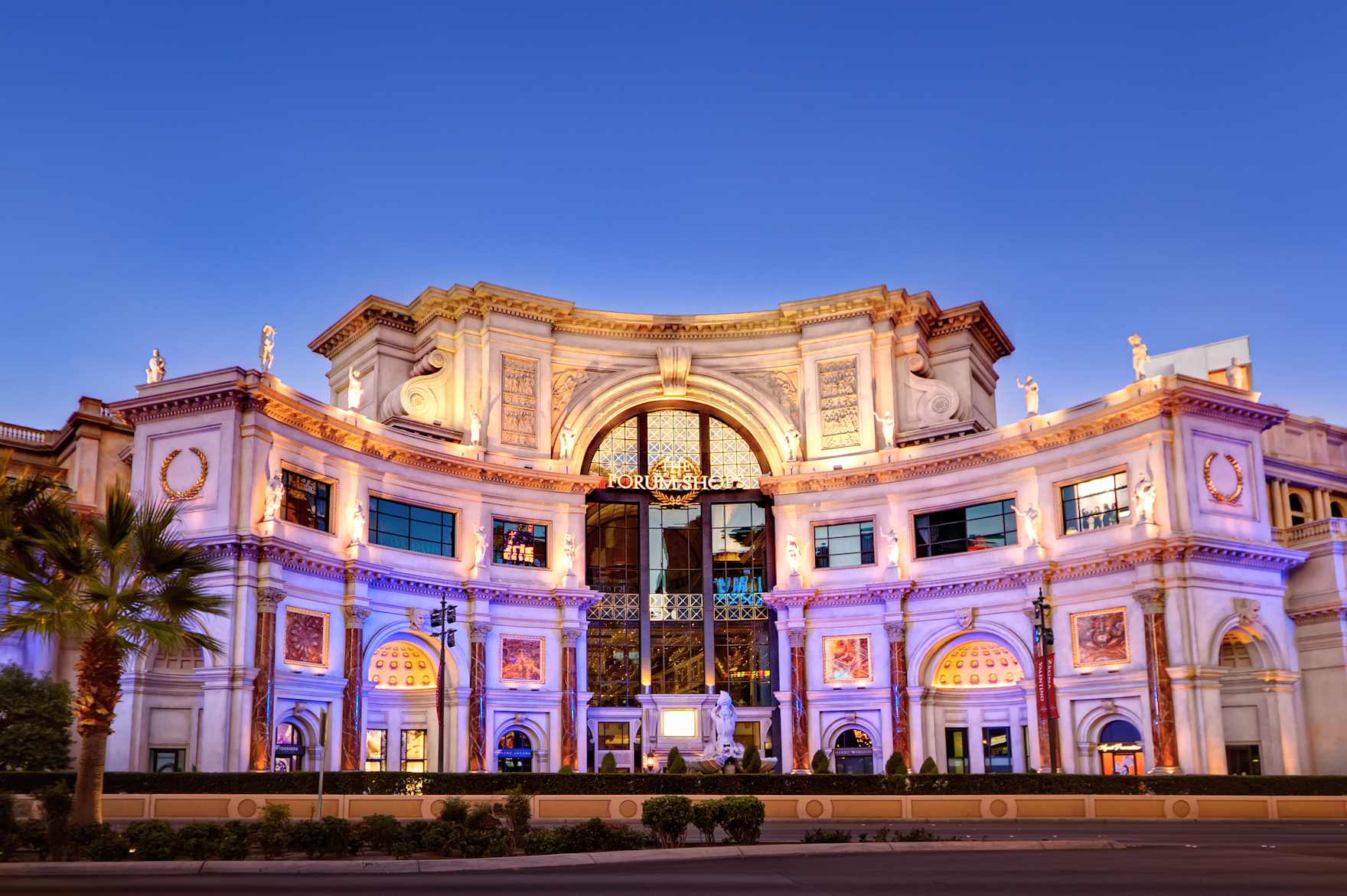
- Main entrance along the Las Vegas Strip, added in 2004 and seen here in September 2011
- Location: Paradise, Nevada, United States
- Coordinates: 36°7′8″N 115°10′34″W
- Address: 3500 South Las Vegas Boulevard
- Opened: May 1, 1992; 34 years ago
- Developer: Melvin Simon & Associates; The Gordon Company
- Manager: Simon Property Group
- Owner: Simon Property Group
- Architect: Marnell Corrao Associates and Terry Dougall (1992, 1997); KGA Architecture (2004)
- Num. of stores: 160
- Floor area: 675,000 square feet (62,700 m^{2})
- Floors: 3
- Website: Official website

The Forum Shops at Caesars Palace, also known as The Forum Shops, is an upscale shopping mall on the Las Vegas Strip in Paradise, Nevada. It is connected to the Caesars Palace resort, and both feature a Roman theme.

The mall project was announced in 1987. It was developed and initially owned by the Gordon Company until co-developer Melvin Simon & Associates (now Simon Property Group) took over full operational control. The land had previously been used for the unsuccessful Caesars Palace Grand Prix. Construction of the Forum Shops began in 1990, and the project opened on May 1, 1992, with 240,000 sq ft (22,000 m^{2}) of leasable space. An expansion opened in 1997. Another expansion opened in 2004. The mall has 675,000 square feet (62,700 m^{2}) and approximately 160 tenants, including various restaurants. It has also offered several shows featuring animatronic statues. Until 2016, The Forum Shops was the highest grossing mall in the U.S., measured in terms of sales per square foot.

== History ==
In April 1987, Caesars Palace announced plans to add a shopping center north of the resort, to be known as the Forum at Caesars. It would be developed by Los Angeles businessman Sheldon Gordon through The Gordon Company. Gordon and Caesars World had spent more than two years planning the project prior to its announcement. The 8.4-acre property had previously been used for the unsuccessful Caesars Palace Grand Prix. Henry Gluck, chairman of Caesars World, reviewed numerous options for redeveloping the site. The idea to replace the racetrack with a shopping mall was devised by Gordon, a longtime friend of Gluck.

Marnell Corrao Associates designed the mall project and worked as general contractor, while Terry Dougall served as interior designer. Melvin Simon & Associates (later Simon Property Group) joined as co-developer, with construction starting in November 1990. Caesars leased the mall land to its developers, which would manage operations, and Caesars would also receive a portion of the tenant rents.

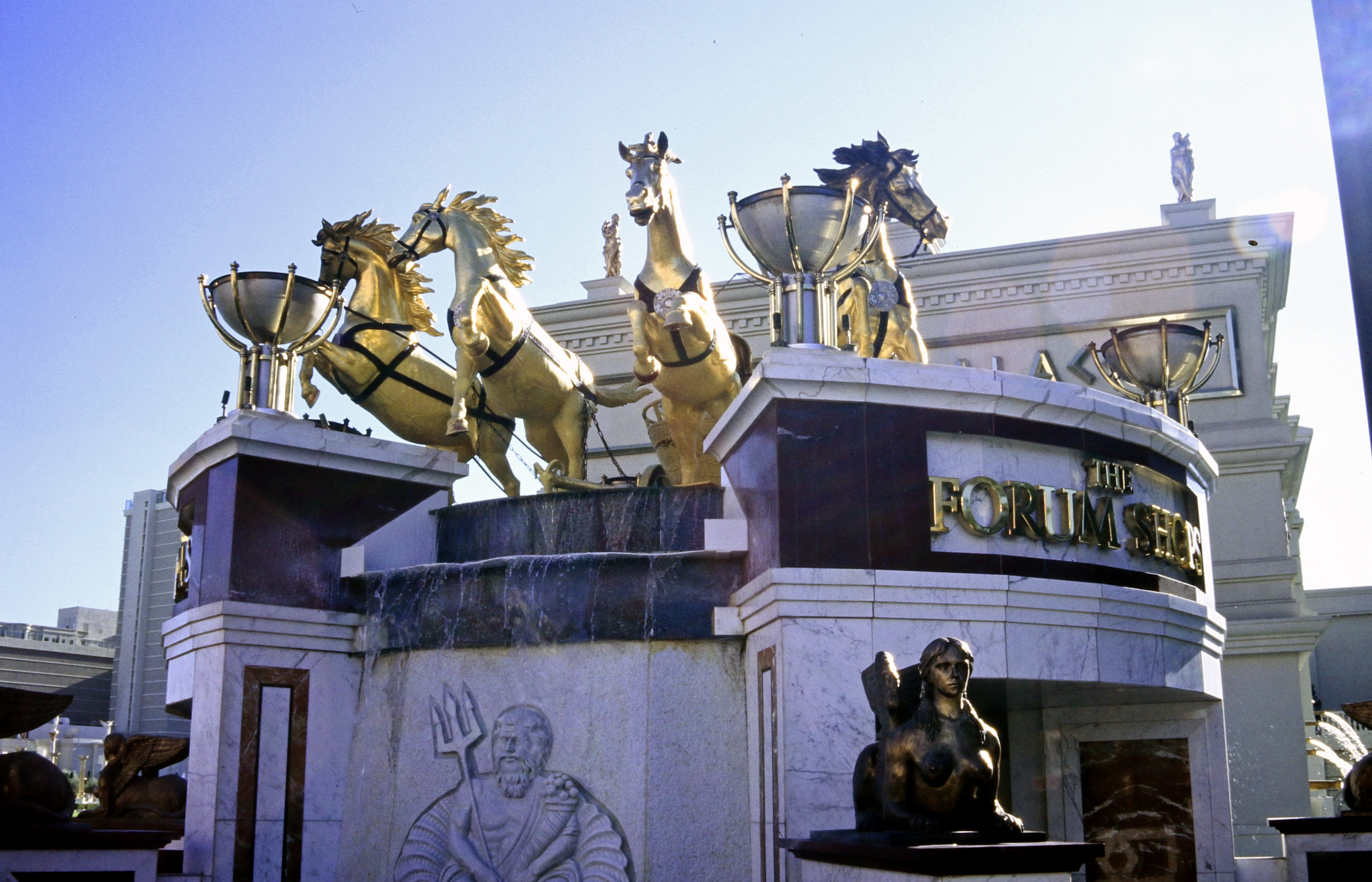
Horse statues outside the mall in 1995, since removed

Stores at the Forum Shops began gradually opening on May 1, 1992. In addition to retail and restaurants, the mall also included a show featuring animatronic statues. Gordon said, "Every city has a Rodeo Drive or Madison Avenue, but not Las Vegas. I think this is the best thing that I've ever done". Local developer Irwin Molasky praised the project, stating that it "takes us light years into the future" while calling it "an adult Disneyland". The Forum Shops helped transform Las Vegas into a destination city for shoppers. Before its opening, the idea of a themed retail mall on the Las Vegas Strip had been met with some skepticism. Another retail center, Fashion Show Mall, had opened on the Strip in 1981. However, it lacked the theme and entertainment features offered at the Forum Shops.

A $65 million expansion was announced in November 1993. It eventually opened on August 29, 1997. Marnell and Dougall returned to design the addition.

A third expansion was announced in 1998. However, the project was delayed by Starwood Hotels's sale of Caesars Palace to Park Place Entertainment, a deal that was finalized at the end of 1999. Construction was expected to begin by early 2001, but this was further delayed by leadership changes within Park Place. Meanwhile, Gordon felt that he was being left out of decisions made by Simon Property Group regarding the mall. Construction on the three-story expansion eventually began in January 2003. A few months later, Simon agreed to buy out Gordon's ownership stake in the mall for $174 million. Simon also operates the mall.

The $139 million expansion opened on October 22, 2004. It was designed by KGA Architecture, while Dougall again returned as interior designer. Perini Building Company was the general contractor. The expansion helped the Forum Shops stay competitive against newer malls on the Strip, including the Grand Canal Shoppes and Desert Passage.

In 2009, Simon was sued by the Equal Employment Opportunity Commission (EEOC), which alleged that four Hispanic janitors at the Forum Shops were subjected to discriminatory treatment a few years earlier. With its lawsuit, the EEOC aimed to prevent such treatment in the future and also sought monetary damages for the janitors, who had since stopped working at the mall. In 2011, Simon agreed to settle the case for $125,000.

== Features ==
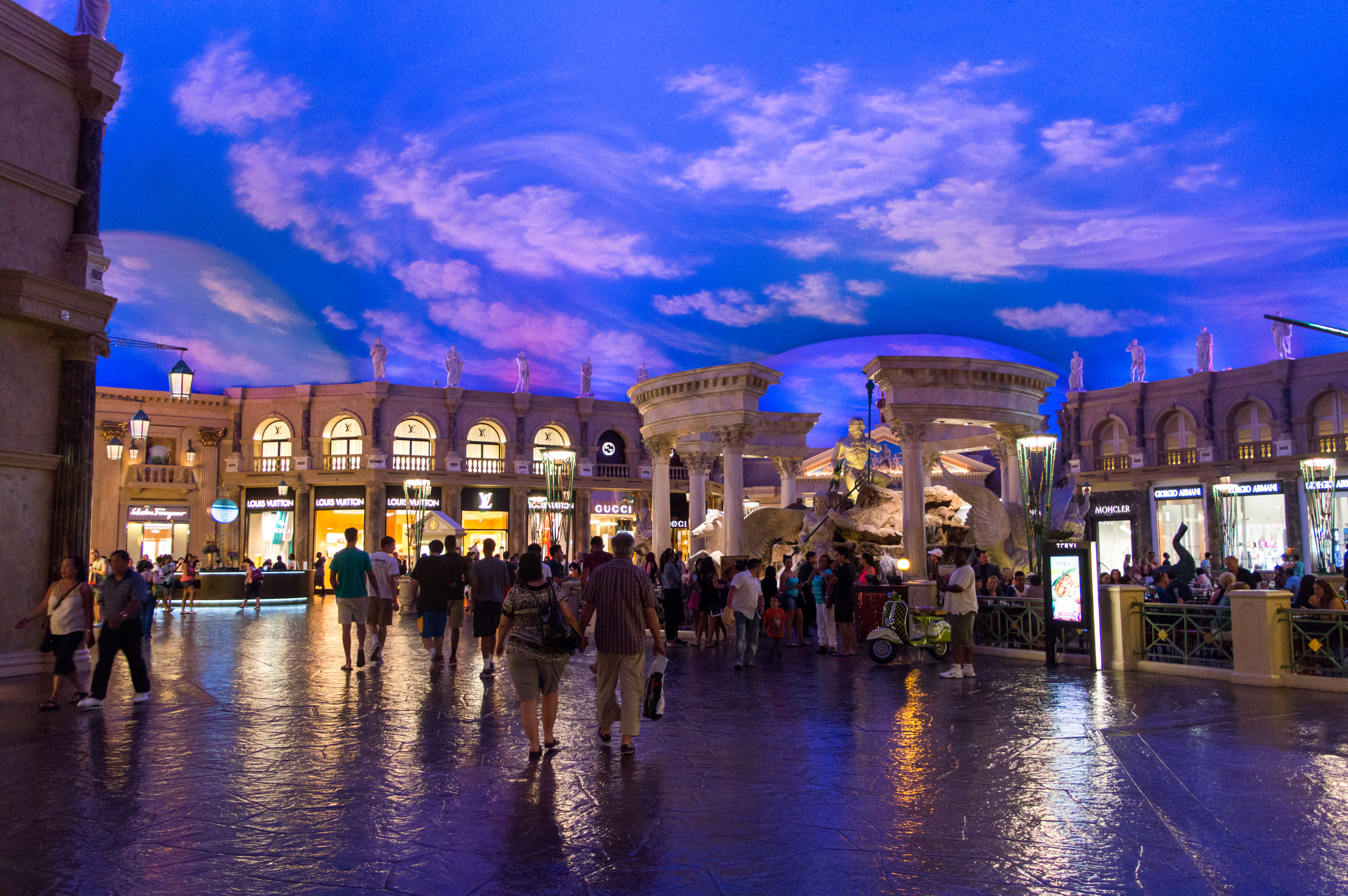
Sky-painted ceilings

Like Caesars Palace, a Roman theme is used throughout the Forum Shops. The mall features an abundance of marble, and several fountains are located inside and out. The interior includes sky-painted ceilings which change from day to night.

The Forum Shops opened with 240,000 sq ft (22,000 m^{2}) of leasable space, and included approximately 60 tenants consisting of stores and restaurants. The 1997 expansion added 276,000 sq ft (25,600 m^{2}), and included 35 stores and restaurants. The 2004 expansion added 175,000 sq ft (16,300 m^{2}). The project added 57 tenants, including stores and restaurants.

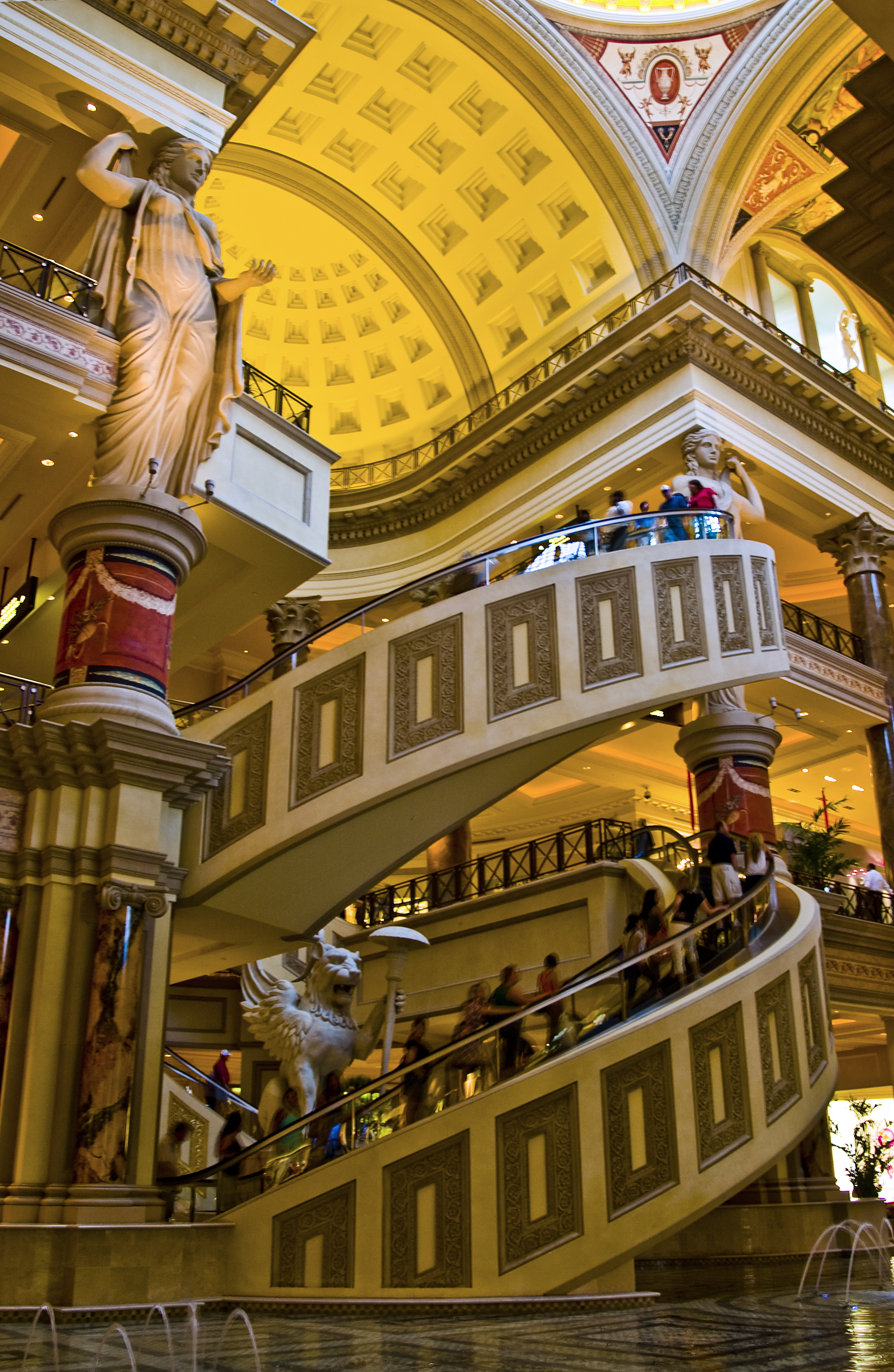
Spiral escalators

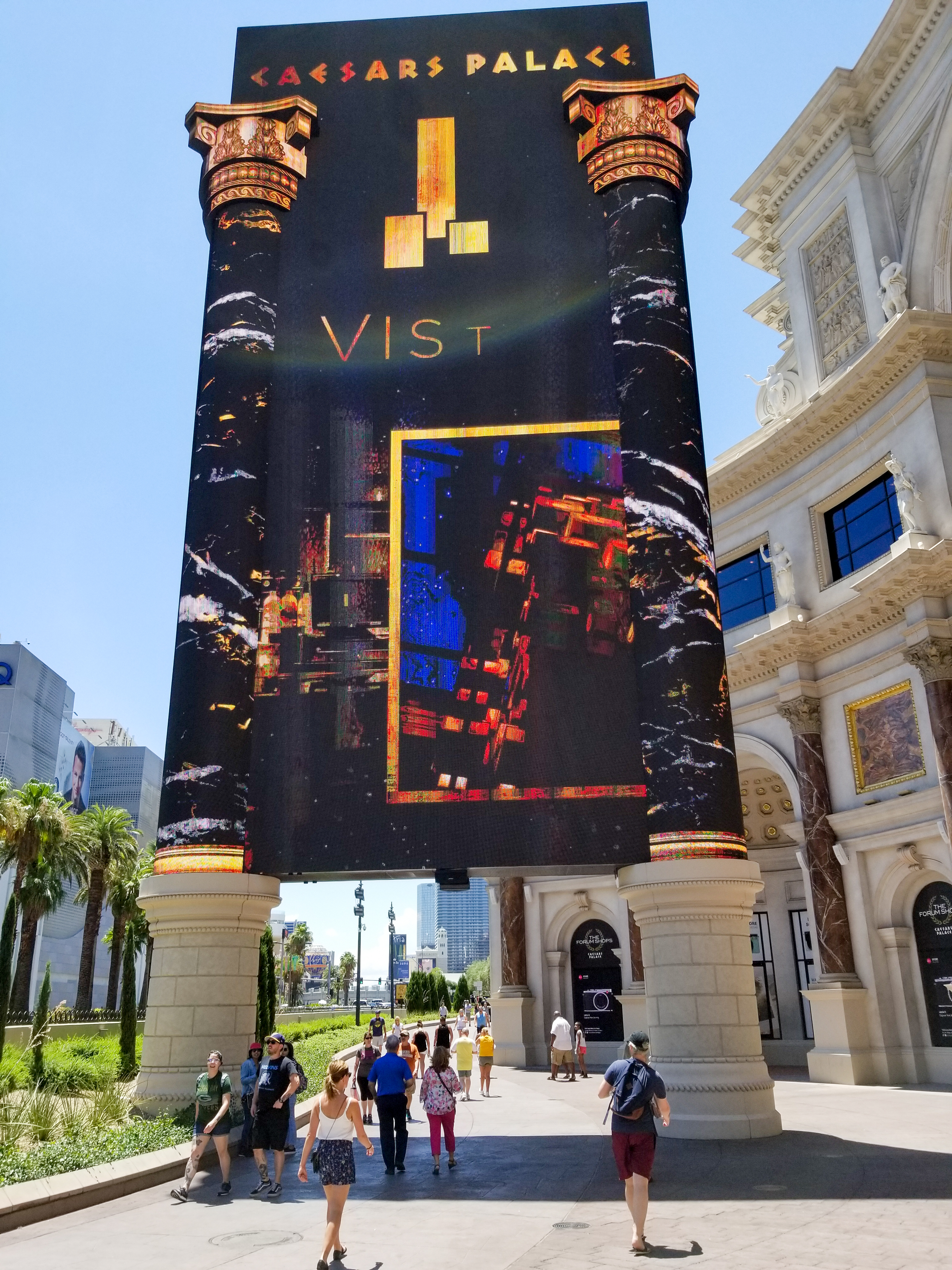
LED sign

The mall has 675,000 sq ft (62,700 m^{2}) of leasable tenant space. It has approximately 160 tenants, including 145 retailers and 15 restaurants. The mall receives an average of 50,000 visitors per day. Approximately 20 percent of the mall's clientele are local residents, with tourists making up the remainder. By 1997, the Forum Shops had become the highest grossing mall in the U.S., measured in terms of sales per square foot. It would retain this title until 2016.

The shops connect to the casino floor at Caesars Palace. Upon opening, moving sidewalks allowed pedestrians to enter the mall from the Las Vegas Strip, although the only way to exit was through the casino. The 2004 expansion was built out to the Strip with the new three-story structure, eliminating the moving walkways. For the mall's 25th anniversary in 2017, a new LED sign was placed at its Strip-side entrance. It measures 85 feet high and 41 feet wide.

The three-story expansion includes a skylight, and features several spiral escalators, created by Mitsubishi Electric. The company spent two years developing the escalators, and took another nine months to install them. At the time, the Forum Shops was one of only two projects in the U.S. to use spiral escalators, joining the Westfield San Francisco Centre shopping mall.

=== Stores ===
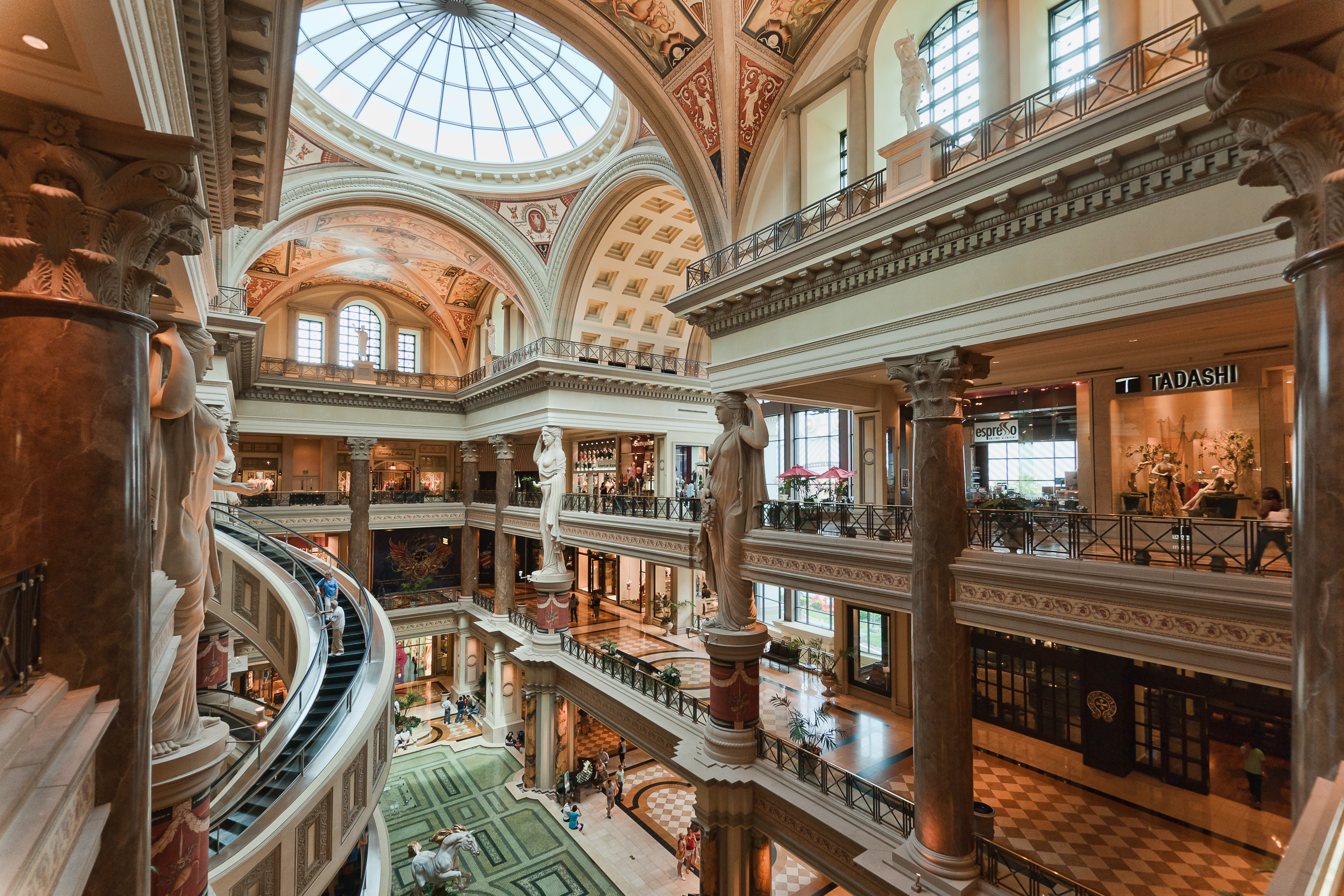
Retailers in the 2004 addition

Upon the mall's opening, notable stores included Gianni Versace, Gucci, Louis Vuitton, Victoria's Secret, and Warner Bros. Studio Store. New retailers added in the 1997 expansion included Bernini, Emporio Armani, Fendi, Hugo Boss, Lalique, Max Mara, Niketown, and Virgin Megastores.

The 1997 project also added a three-story FAO Schwarz toy store, measuring 56,000 sq ft (5,200 m^{2}). It was the largest store at the mall, and featured numerous animatronics, including a Trojan Horse rising more than 40 feet. The store was a key attraction for the Forum Shops. FAO Schwarz's location there was one of two to survive the company's bankruptcy in 2003. Two years later, the store added an ice cream parlor, bakery and candy shop. FAO Schwarz closed in 2010, and was replaced later that year by the world's largest H&M store, which operated until 2024.

The 2004 expansion added many designer tenants, including Carolina Herrera, Celine, Chrome Hearts, Custo Barcelona, Giuseppe Zanotti, Kiehl's, Peter Max, and Thomas Pink. It also marked the first U.S. location for Juicy Couture. Some existing tenants, such as Louis Vuitton and Christian Dior, were enlarged as part of the expansion. Tourneau's store grew from 1,036 sq ft (96.2 m^{2}) to 13,410 sq ft (1,246 m^{2}), making it the largest watch store in the U.S.

In 2005, the Forum Shops added an exotic car dealership featuring new and used vehicles in a 34,000 sq ft (3,200 m^{2}) showroom, including 8,000 sq ft (740 m^{2}) of retail space. A 2,000 sq ft (190 m^{2}) Playboy-branded clothing store also opened in 2005. Other retailers added since then have included Christian Lacroix, Intermix, De Beers, and Tiffany & Co.

=== Shows ===
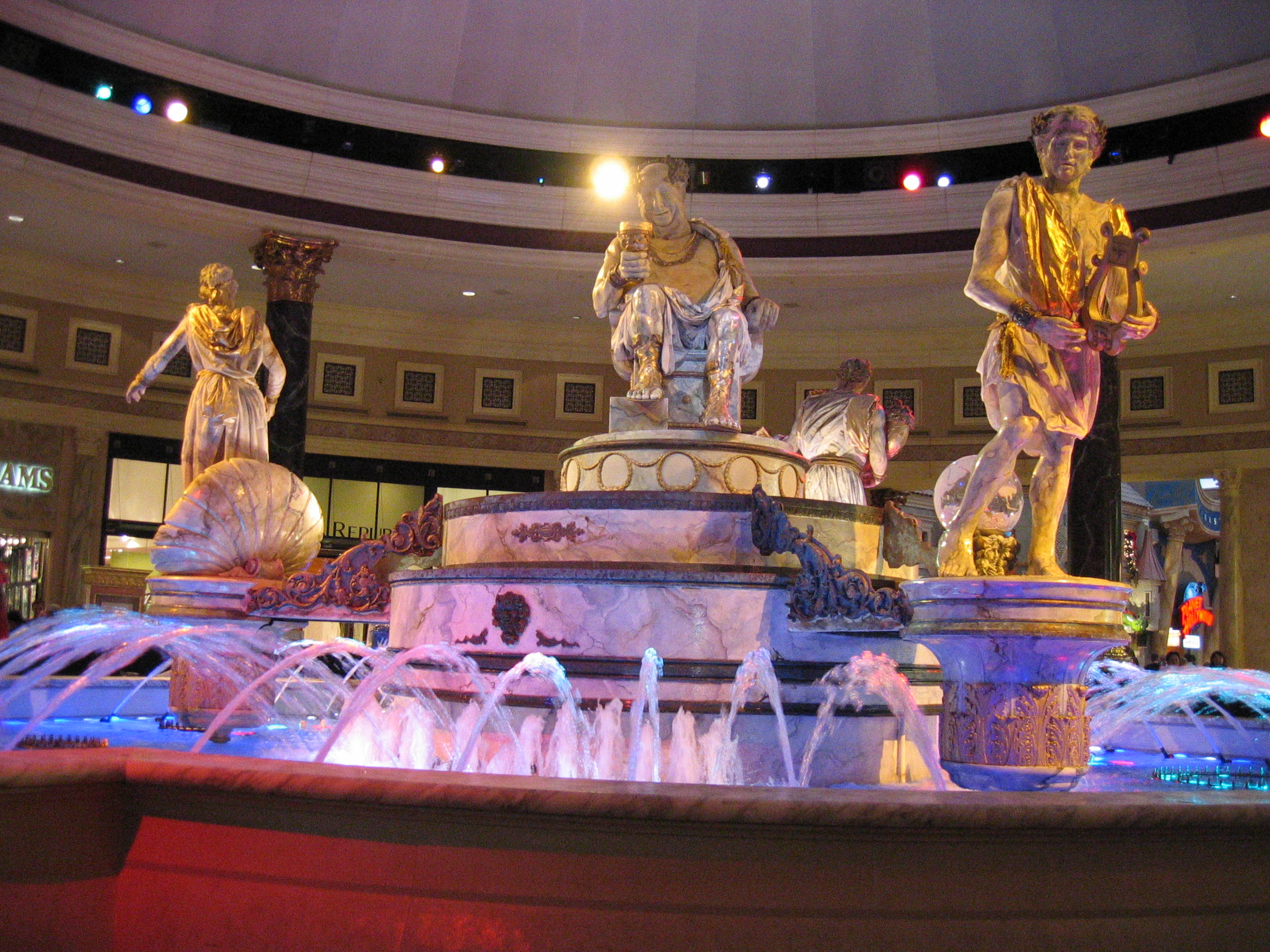
The original animatronic show, seen in 2002

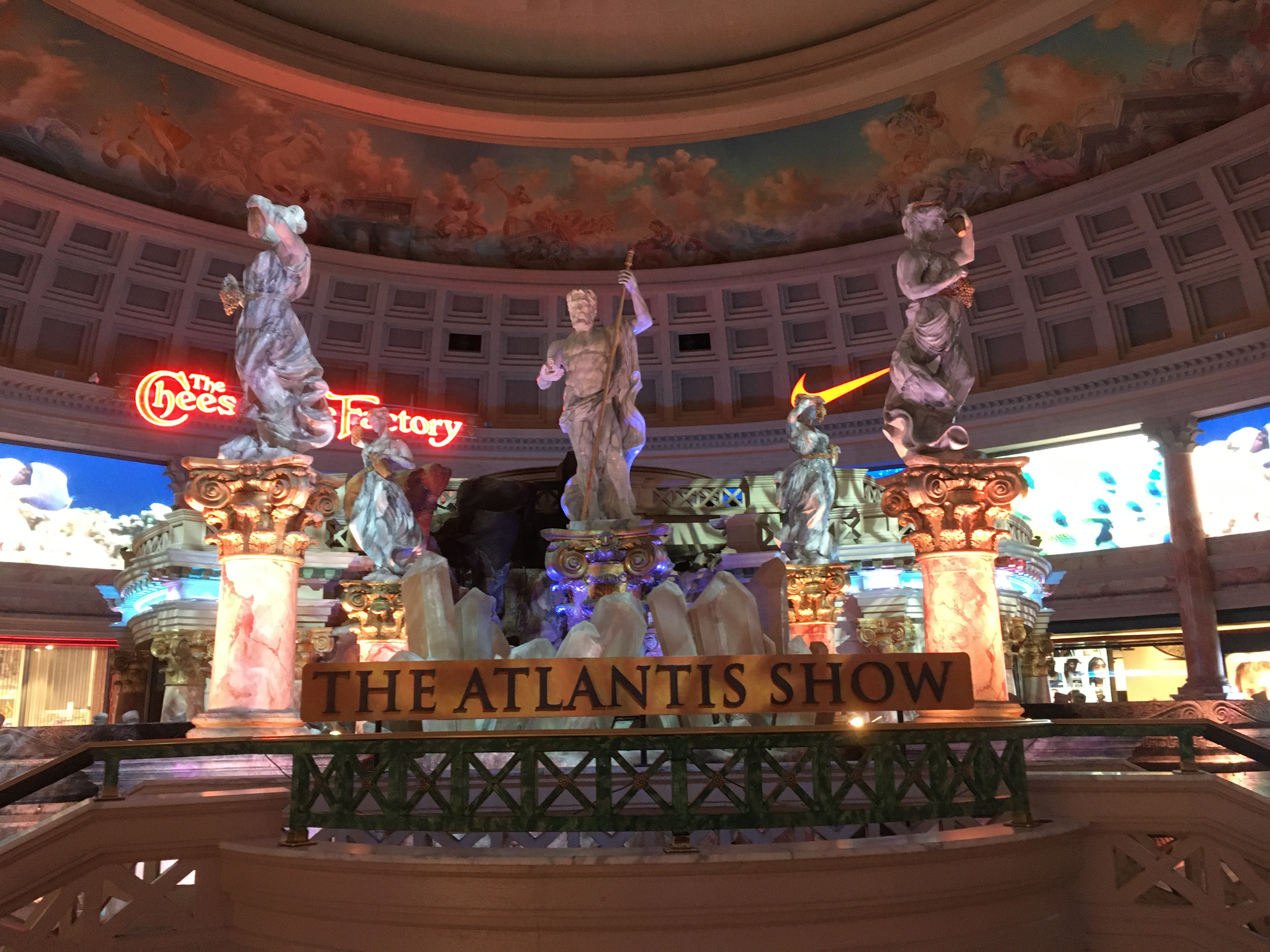
The newer Atlantis Show, as seen in 2020

Upon opening, the Forum Shops debuted with the Festival Fountain, which cost $4 million. It was the site of a free hourly show featuring lasers and animatronic statues depicting Apollo, Bacchus, Plutus, and Venus. The show was redesigned in 1997, receiving reskinned animatronics, different lighting effects, and a new sound system. The show ended in 2011 and the statues were removed. By that point, the animatronics had been prone to glitches, and their dialogue was difficult for some to understand. The fountain remains in place.

Another free fountain show opened with the 1997 expansion, featuring its own animatronic statues. The show depicts King Atlas and his children; the latter feud over who will have control of Atlantis, which is ultimately sunk. The show incorporates fire and water effects. A 50,000-gallon aquarium, containing 500 tropical fish, was built as part of the new show. The Atlantis Show reopened in 2013, following a four-month makeover. It was the show's first overhaul, and included new skin and costumes for the animatronics, which were a key attraction for the mall. Beneath the fountain and aquarium is a workshop of technicians who maintain the show.

A paid motion-simulator ride, Race for Atlantis, also opened at the end of 1997. It was conceived by Gordon and created by IMAX Corporation. The show depicted Neptune as he battled for control of Atlantis. It closed in 2004, and was replaced by the mall's car dealership.

=== Restaurants ===
The Forum Shops opened with 11 dining establishments. Among them was Spago by chef Wolfgang Puck. It operated from 1992 to 2018. An Italian seafood restaurant, Lombardi's, also opened with the mall. Shortly thereafter, Lombardi's was sold and became part of the Bertolini's chain of Italian restaurants. It was again renamed as Trevi in 2007, following a renovation. It was located beside the Fountain of the Gods, until its closure in 2024.

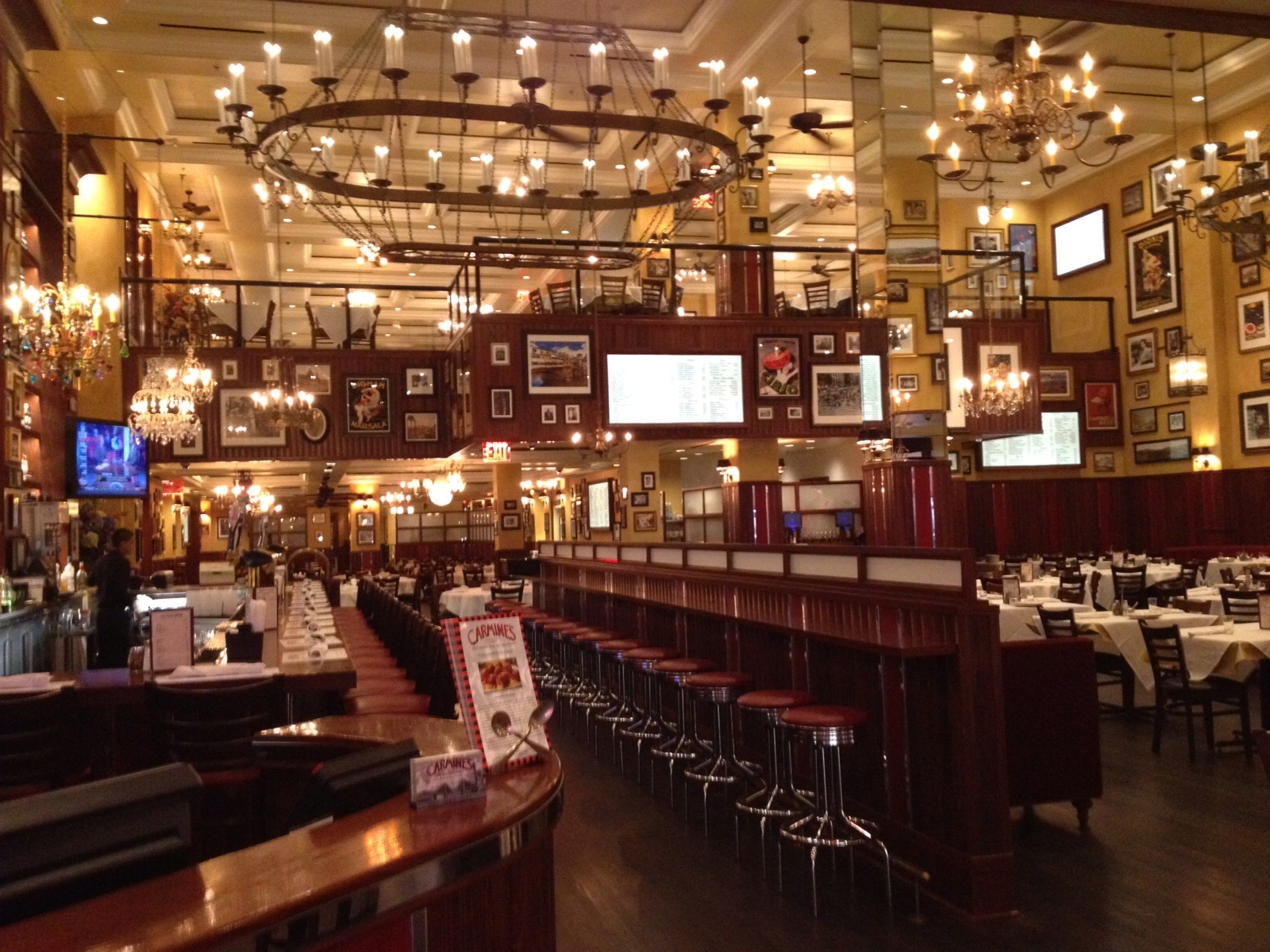
Carmine's in 2013

The Palm, another Italian restaurant serving steak and seafood, opened in 1993 and continues to operate. A Planet Hollywood restaurant opened in 1994, and included an exterior sign featuring a 25-foot diameter globe. Planet Hollywood moved to a new mall spot in 2012, further from the casino entrance. The restaurant closed in 2023, citing reduced business as a result of the new location.

The Cheesecake Factory was among new restaurants added in the 1997 expansion, along with Caviarteria, focusing primarily on caviar dishes and champagnes. Puck also opened another restaurant, Chinois, which operated until 2009.

The 2004 expansion added five restaurants, including Sushi Roku, a Segafredo Zanetti Expresso Cafe, and Joe's Seafood, Prime Steak & Stone Crab. Stage Deli, an original tenant which began in New York, closed at the Forum Shops in 2008.

An Italian restaurant, Carmine's, opened in 2013. At 27,000 sq ft (2,500 m^{2}), it is among the largest restaurants on the Strip. Several new restaurants were added in 2019, including Water Grill, which took the former Spago space. In 2022, Bill and Giuliana Rancic opened the RPM Italian restaurant.

=== Nightclub ===
A nightclub, OPM, opened in 2003. The space was sub-leased by Chinois, and it served food from the restaurant. OPM was renamed Poetry in 2007, before closing in 2009.

Two years prior to the closure, Simon Property Group had filed a suit against Chinois' ownership company, alleging that it misrepresented the type of club that OPM would be. Poetry owner Mike Goodwin later filed a suit against the mall, noting that its main entrance gate was shut on Friday and Saturday nights, giving many patrons the mistaken impression that the nearby club was closed on such nights. Instead, club-goers had to enter by passing through a back-of-house corridor.

Regarding the gate closures, Goodwin accused the mall of racial discrimination, noting that the club's clientele was primarily African-American. According to Goodwin, "There is a belief in Corporate America that too many black people on your property harms business. It seems to be the way they are acting". The mall rejected the accusation while noting incidents involving disruptive club-goers. Caesars Palace stated that the gate closures were "in response to serious breaches of the peace that put Caesars' patrons, employees and others on Caesars' premises at risk of physical harm". A judge eventually dismissed Goodwin's lawsuit.

== Gallery ==
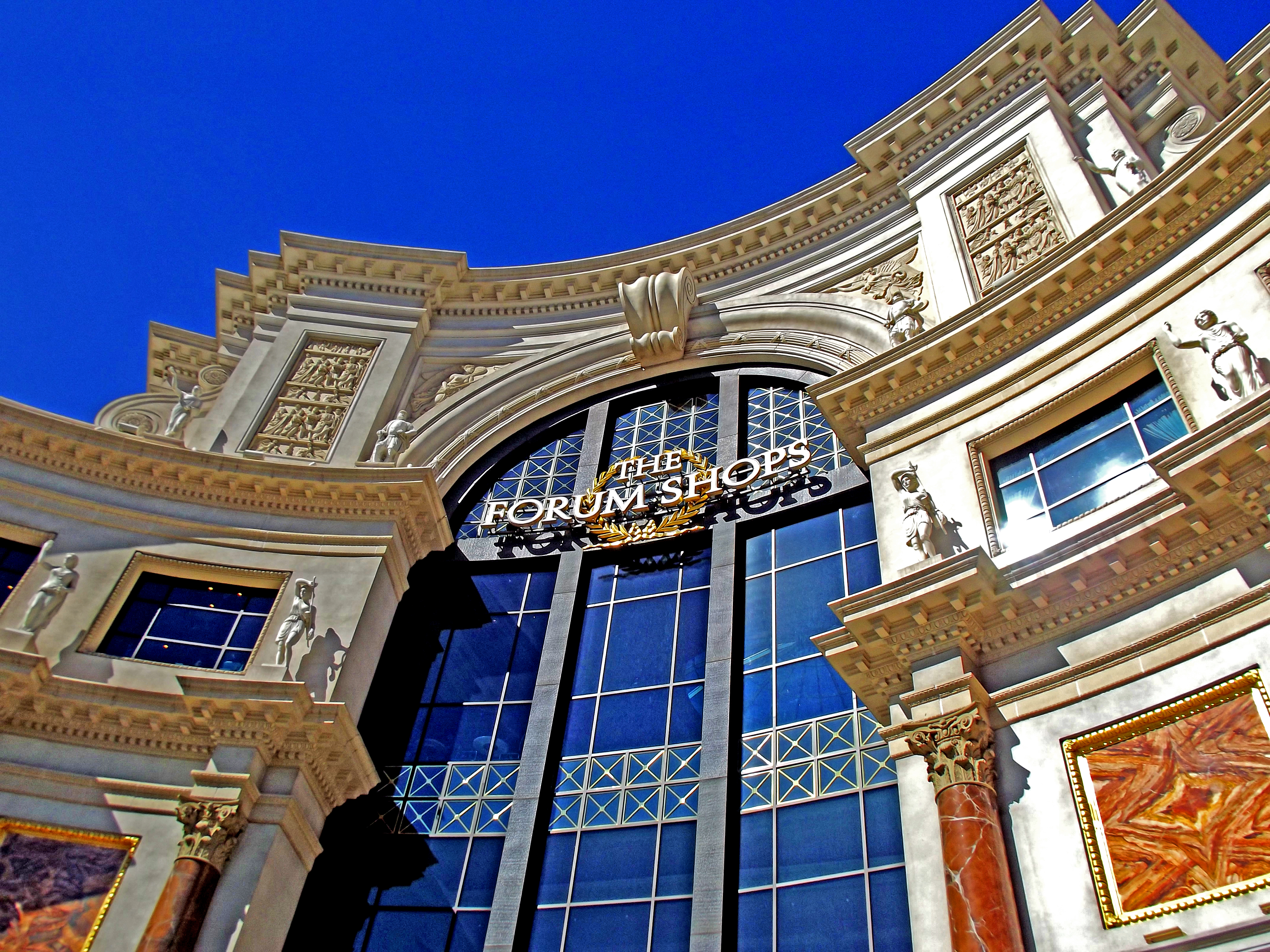
Close-up of the Strip entrance

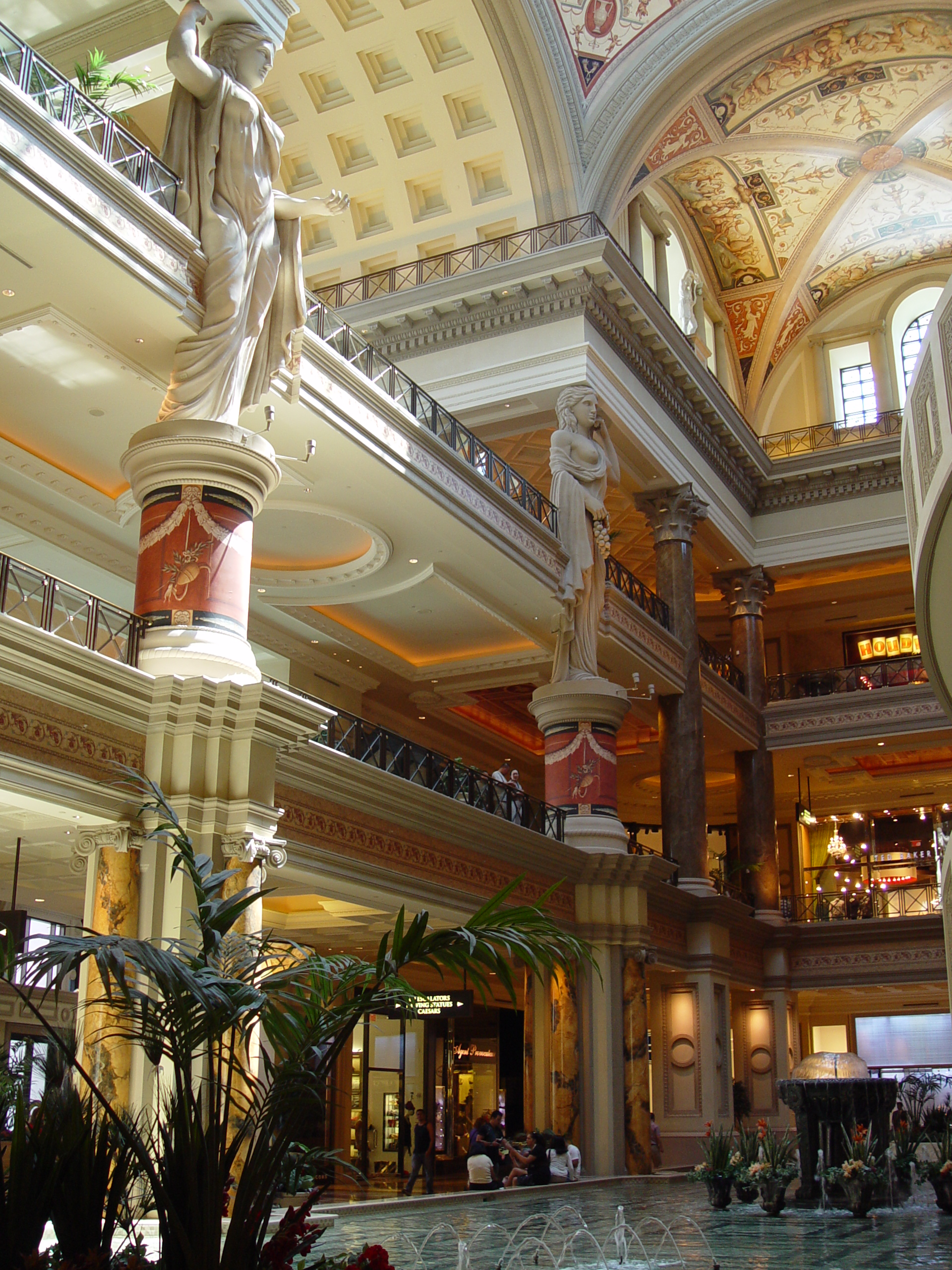
Three-story area of the mall

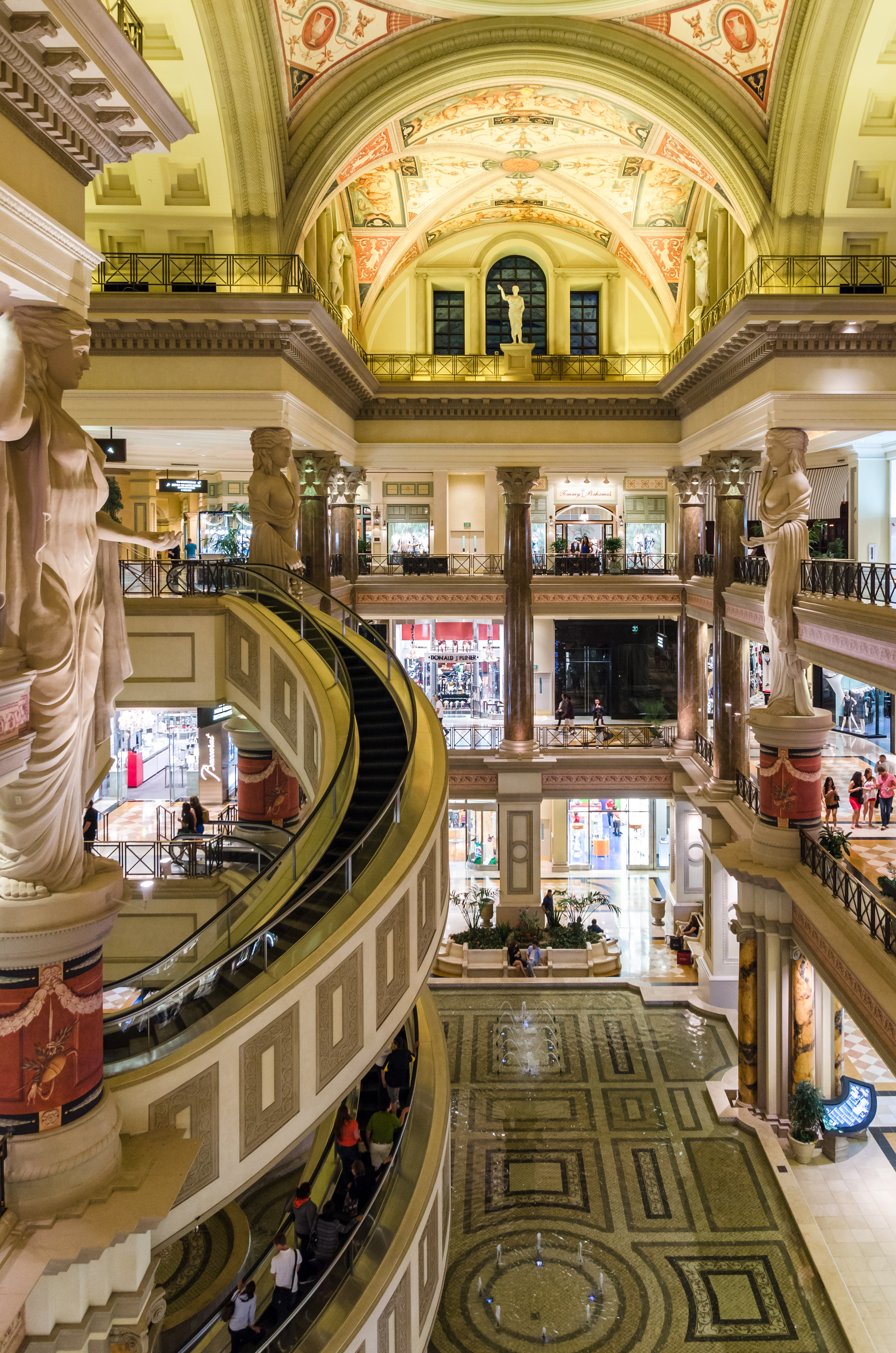
View from the third floor

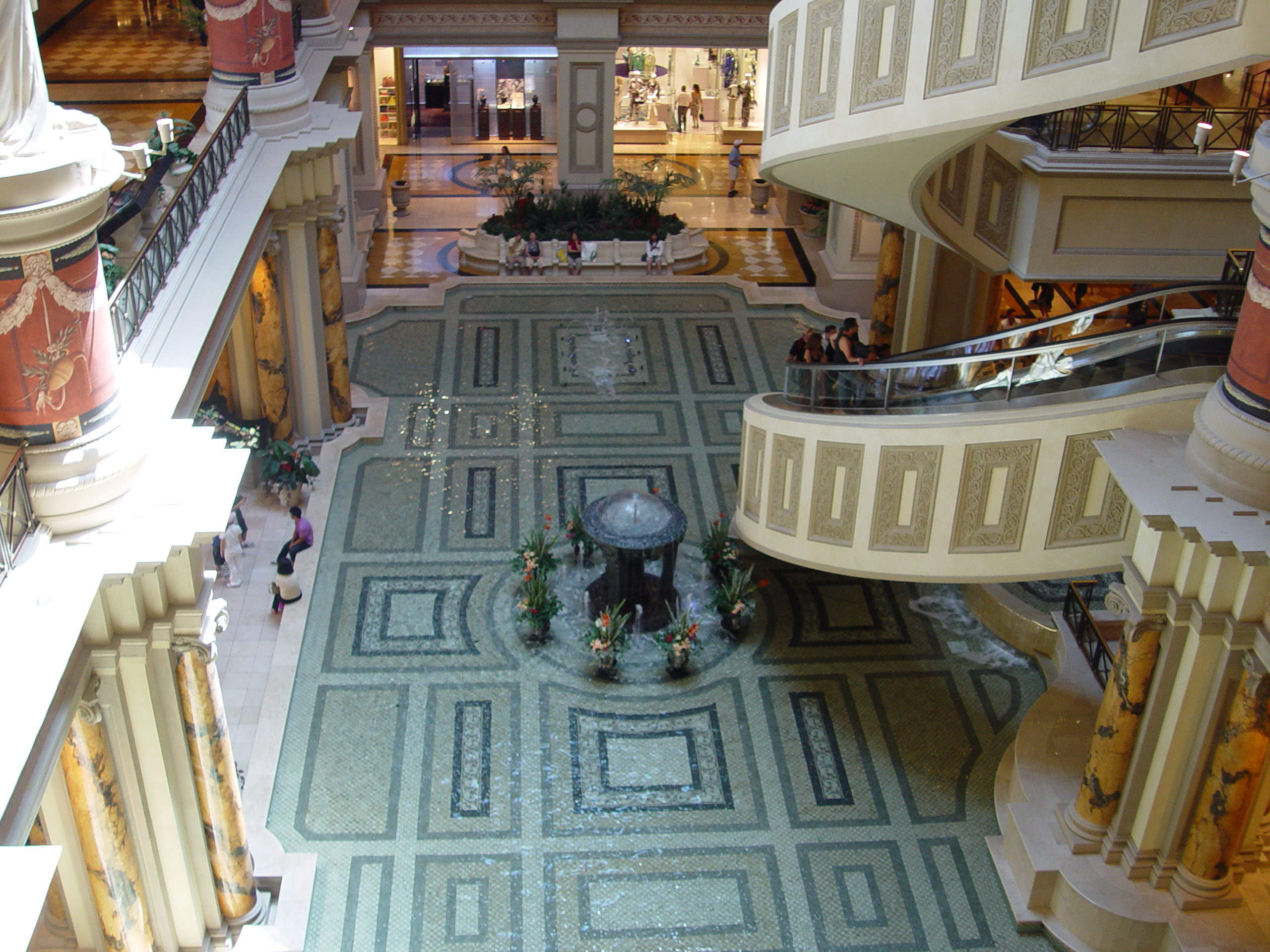
Water feature in the three-story area

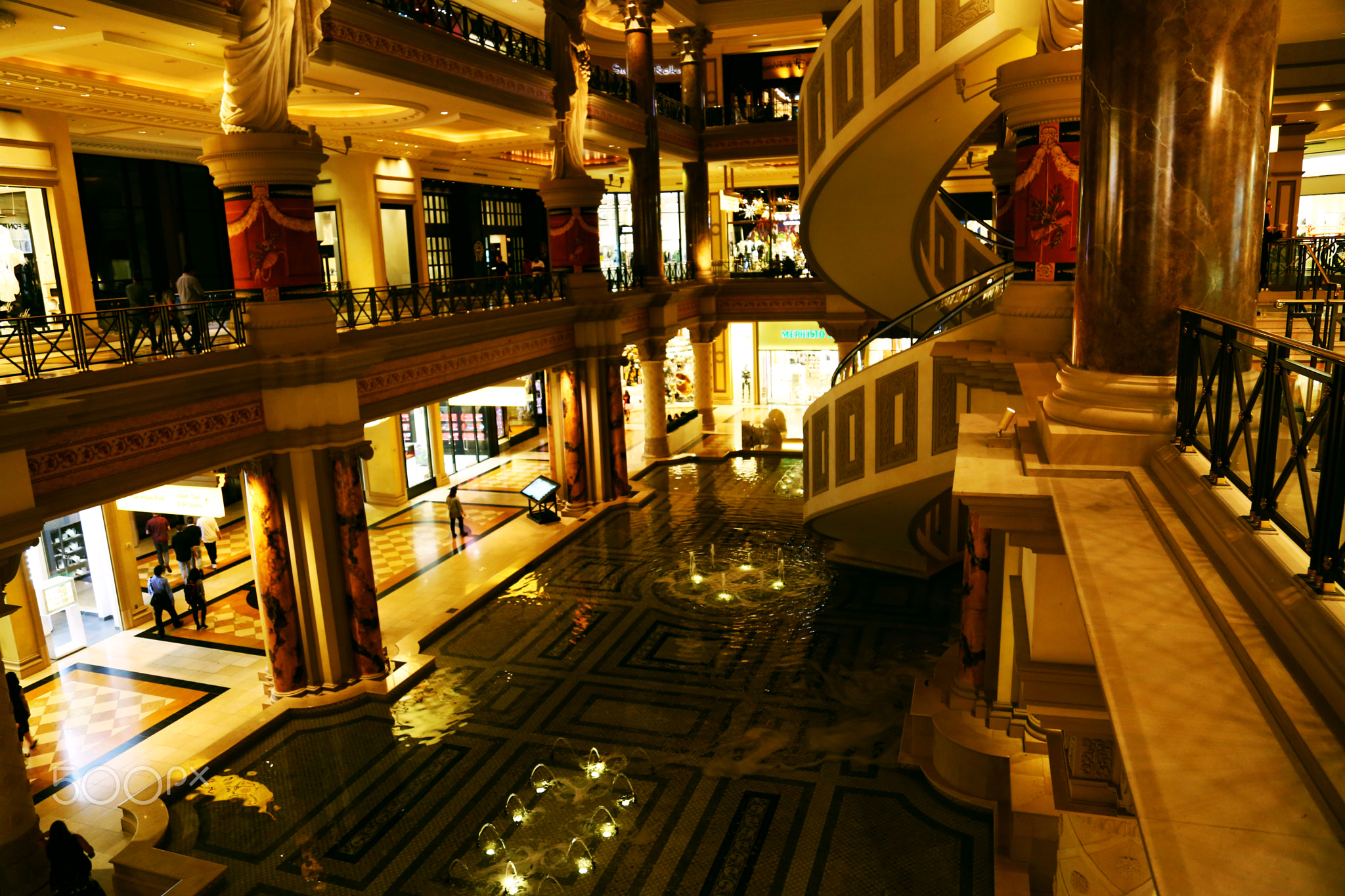
Same area at night

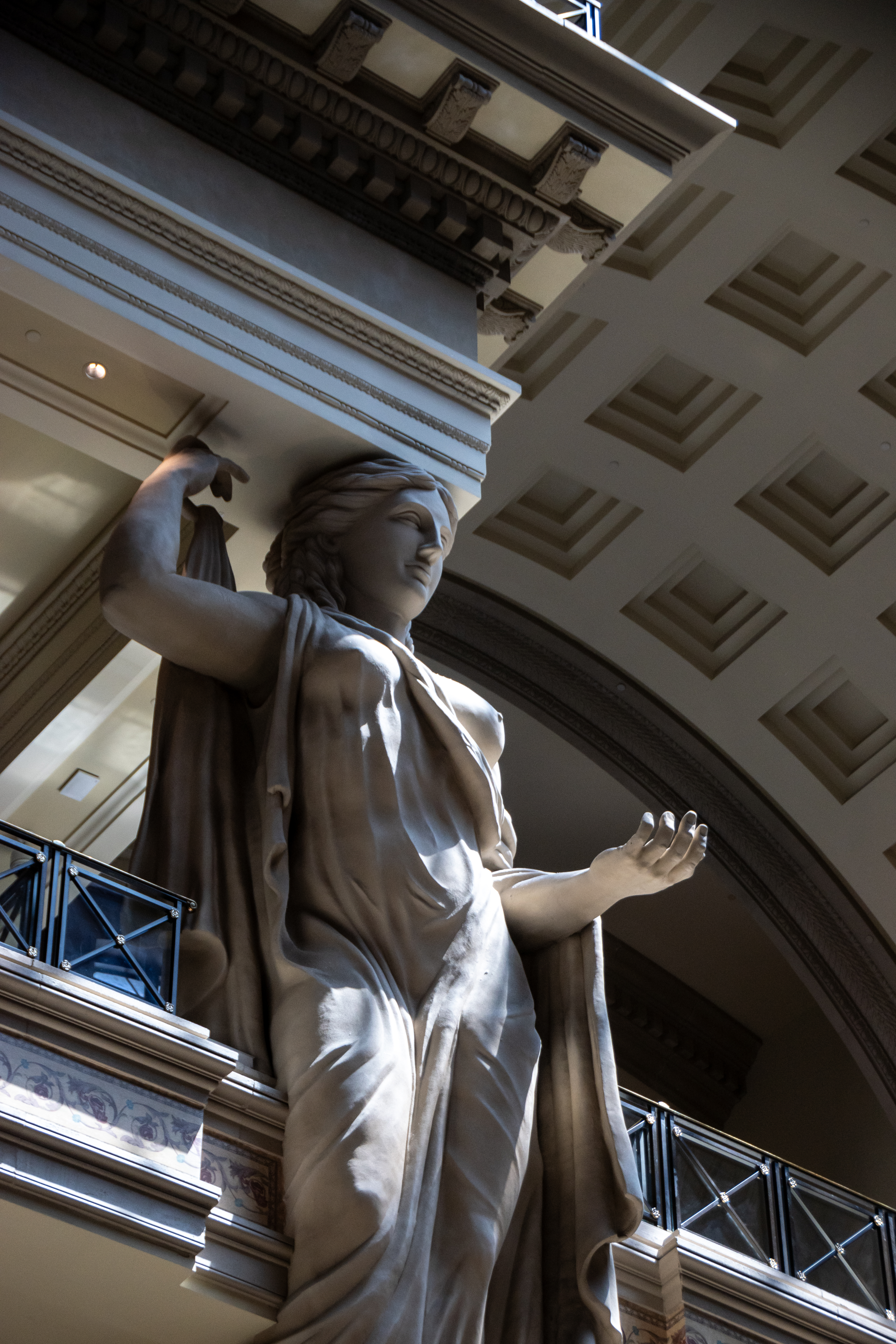
A caryatid in the three-story area of the mall

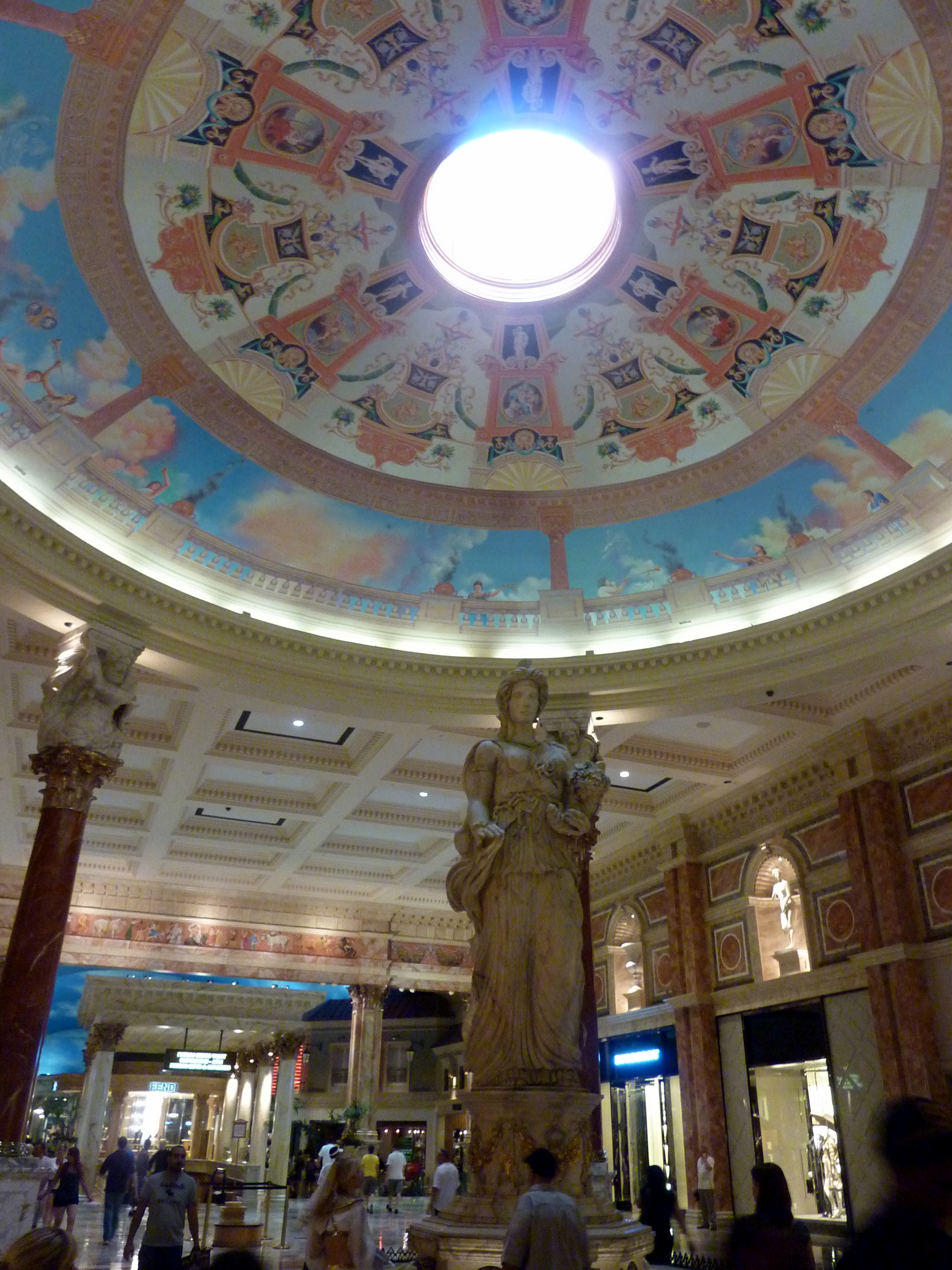
Another statue elsewhere in the mall

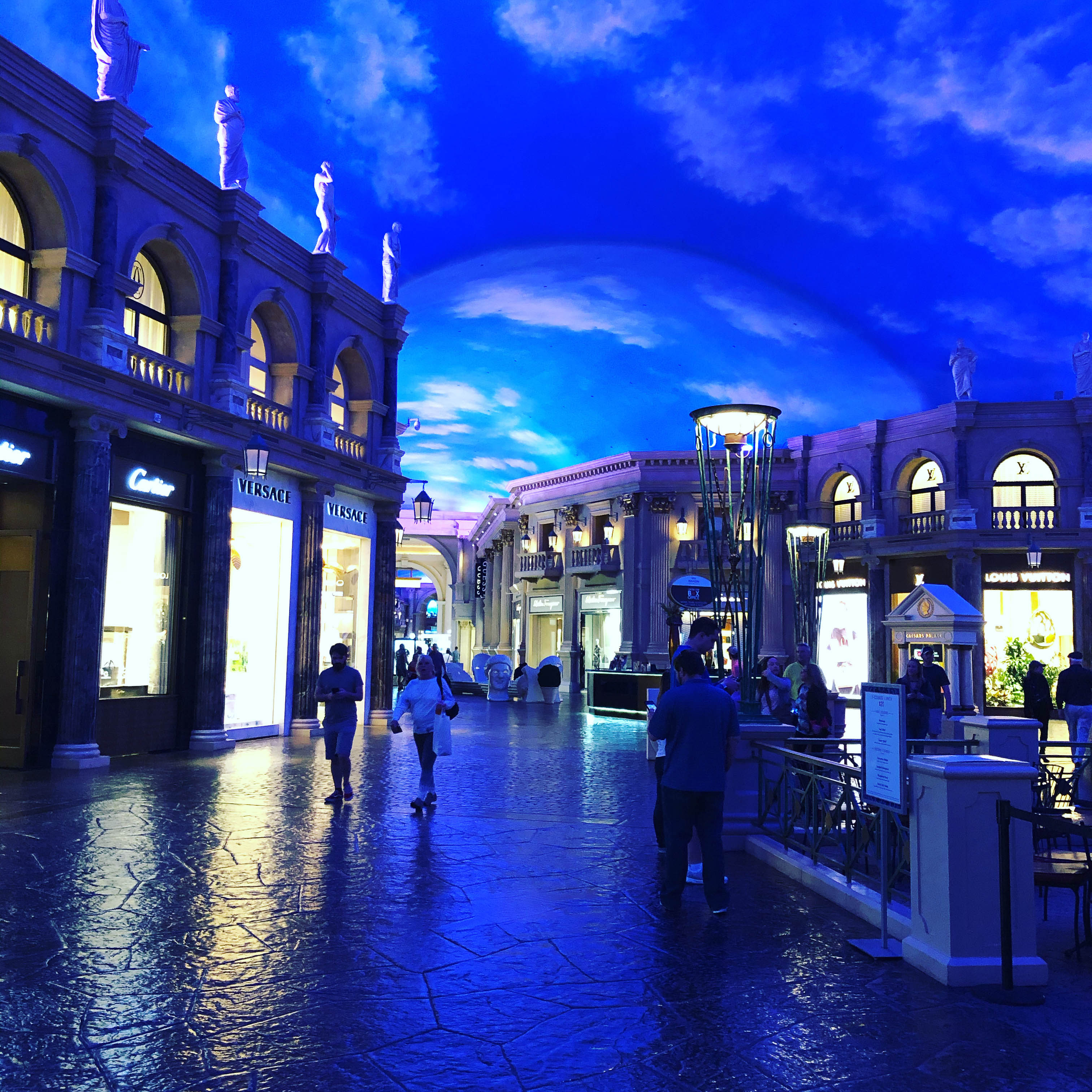
Darkened sky ceiling

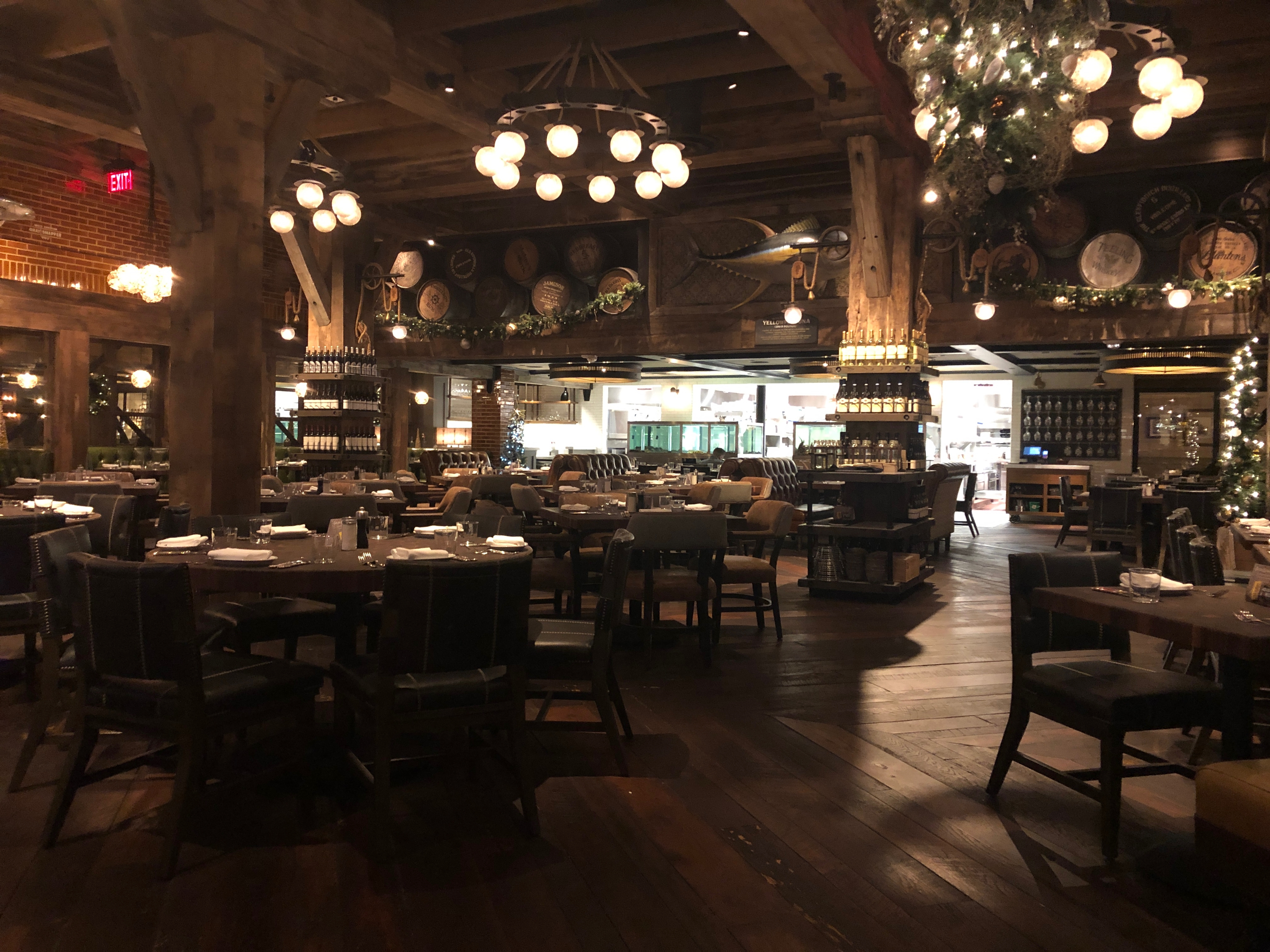
Water Grill restaurant

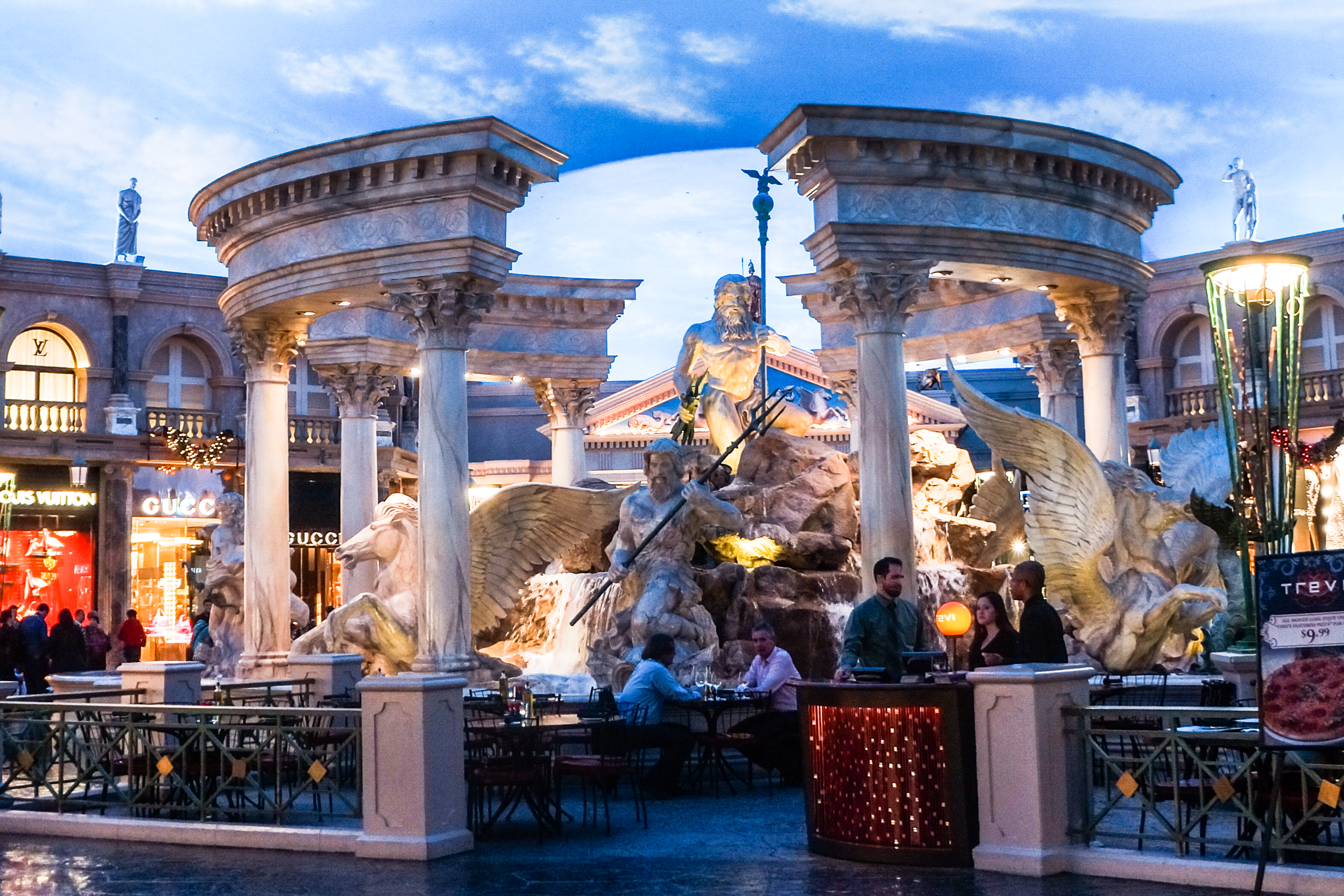
Trevi restaurant

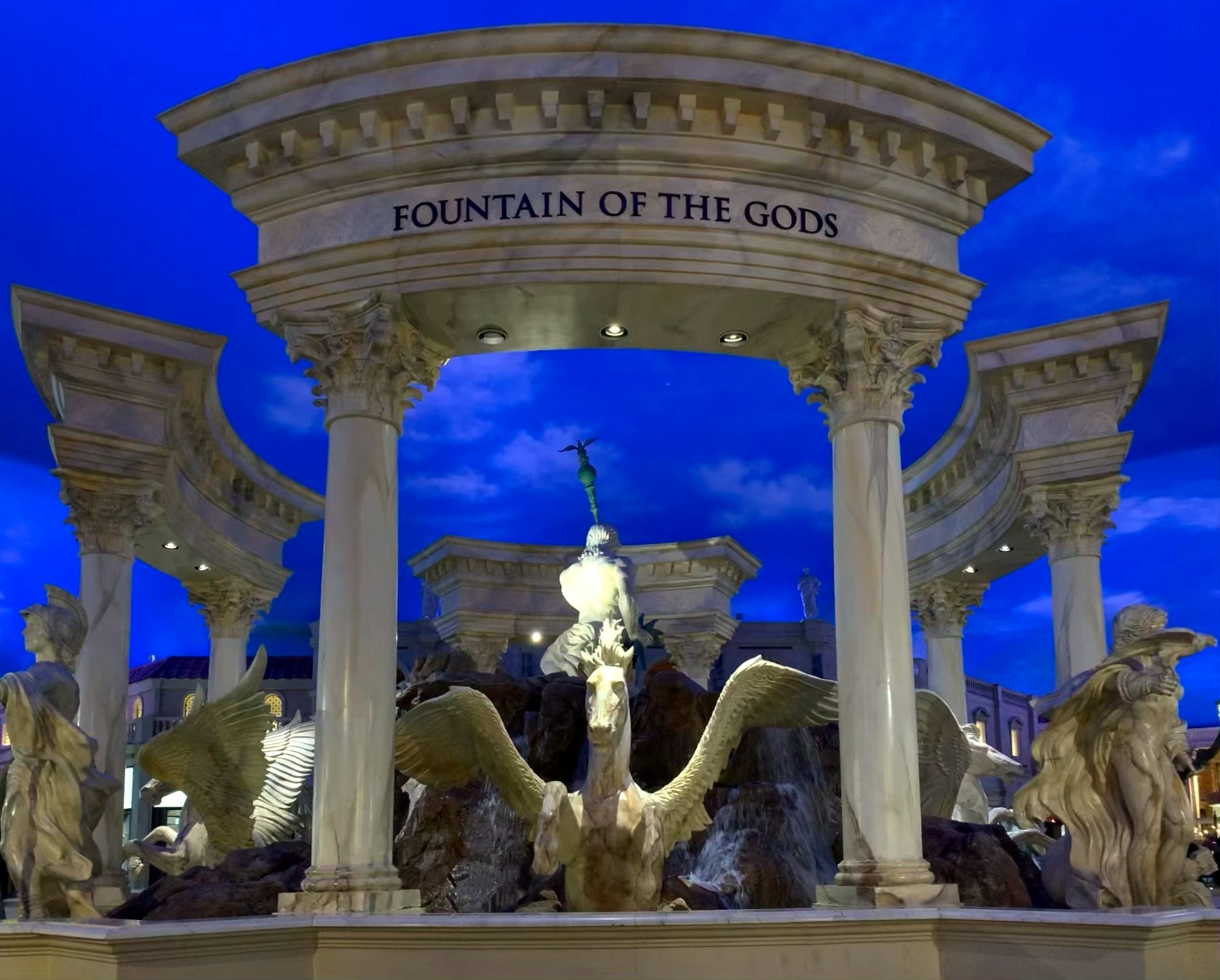
Fountain of the Gods

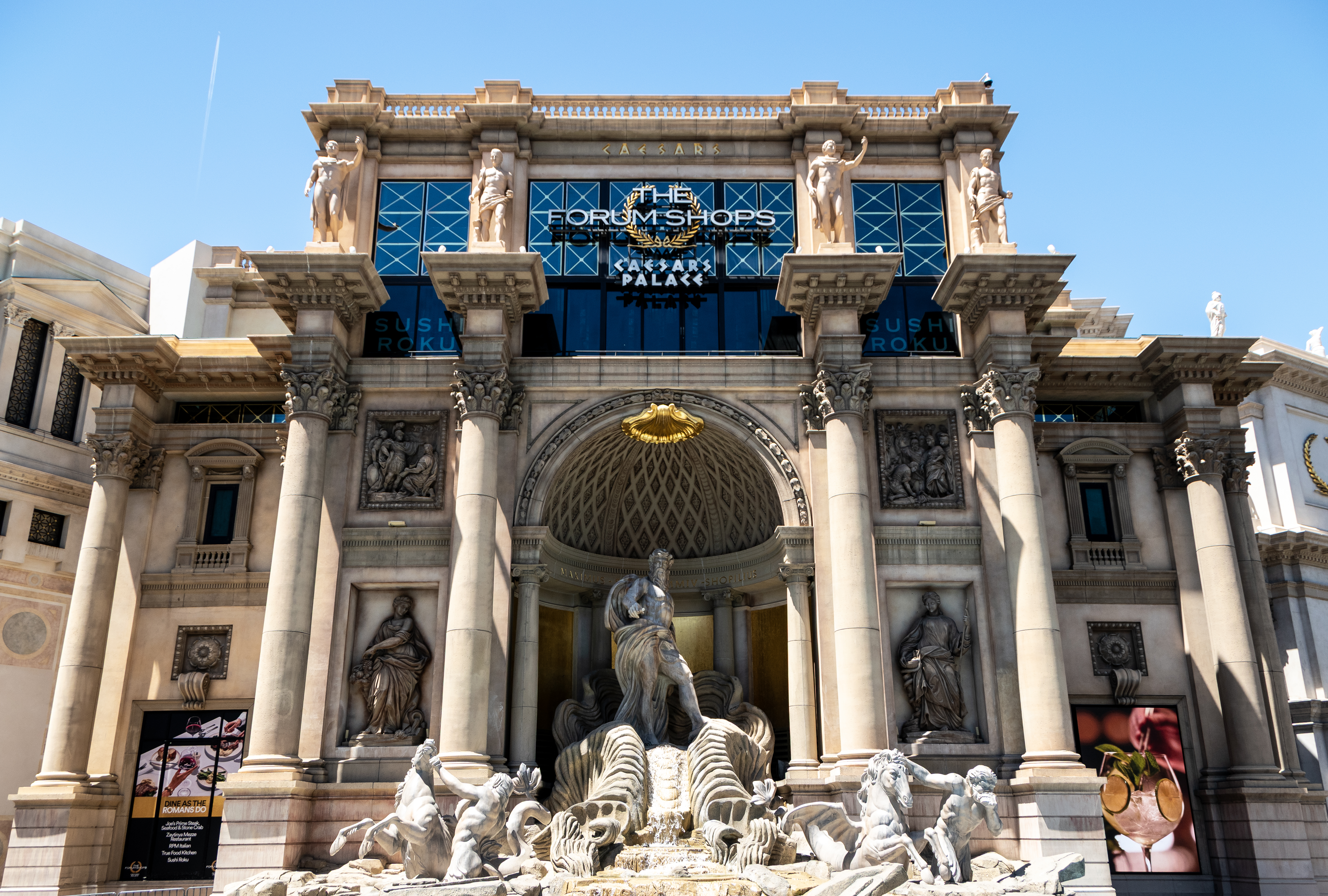
Replica of the Trevi Fountain

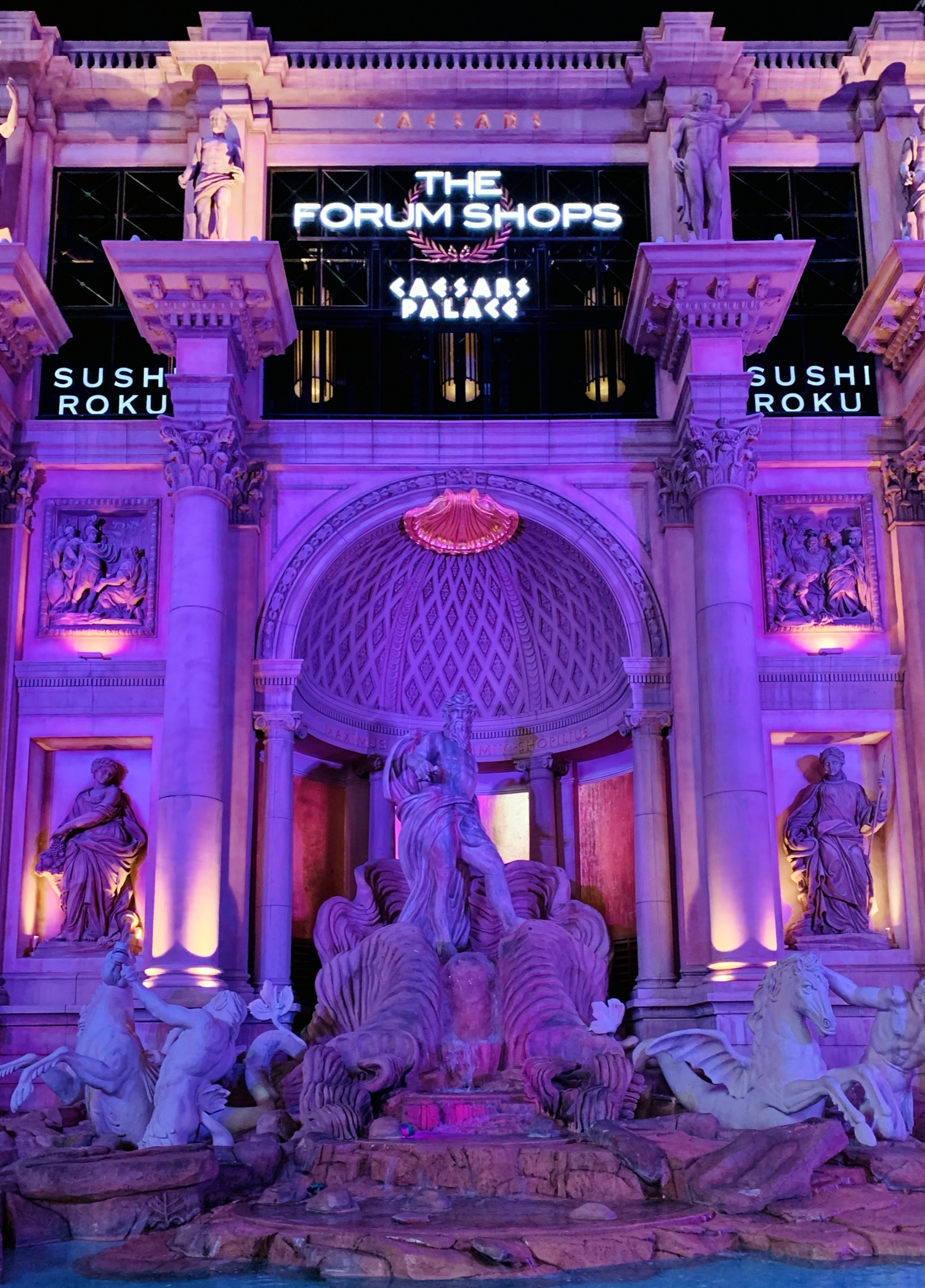
Trevi Fountain at night

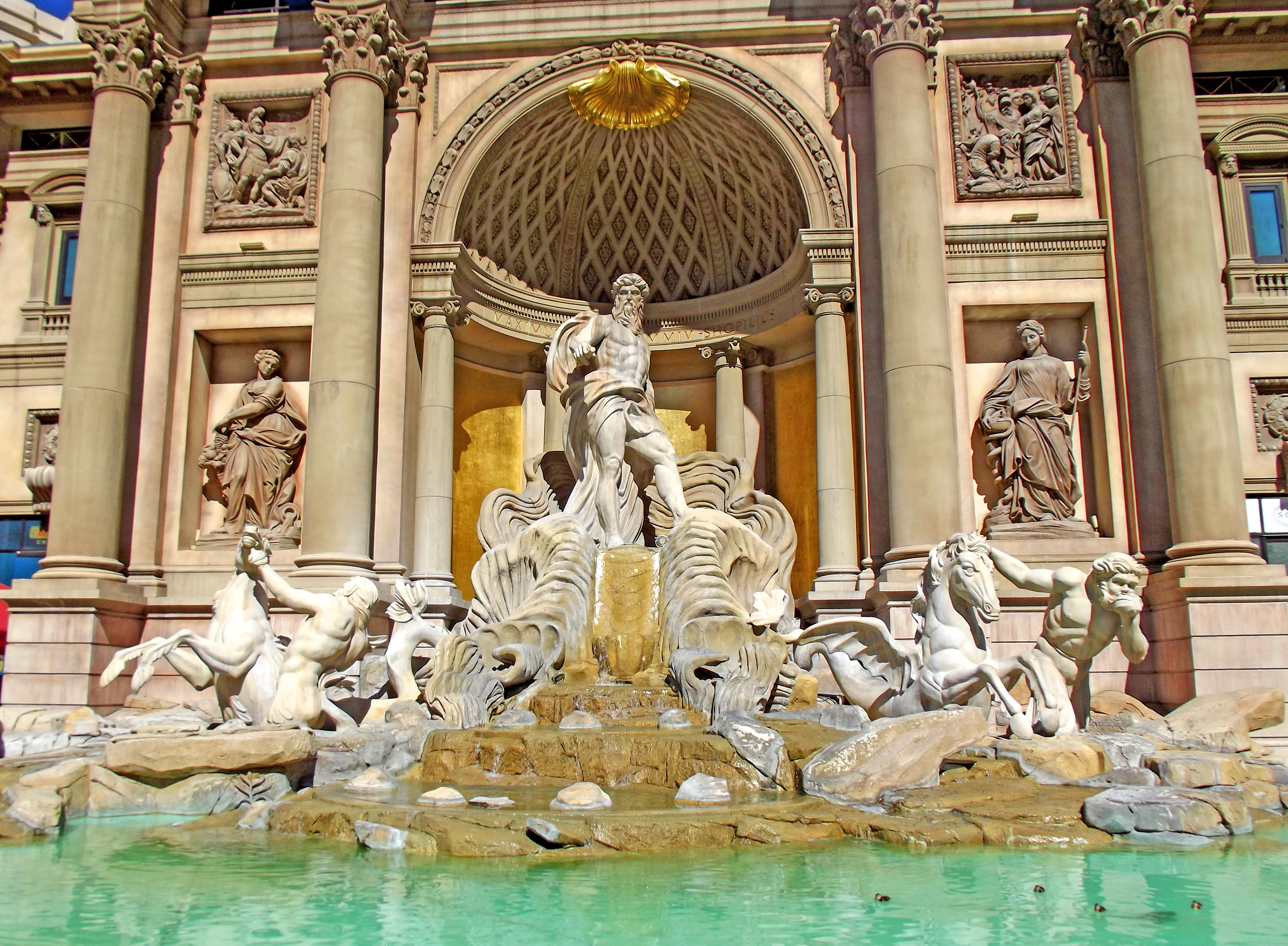
A closer look at the Trevi Fountain

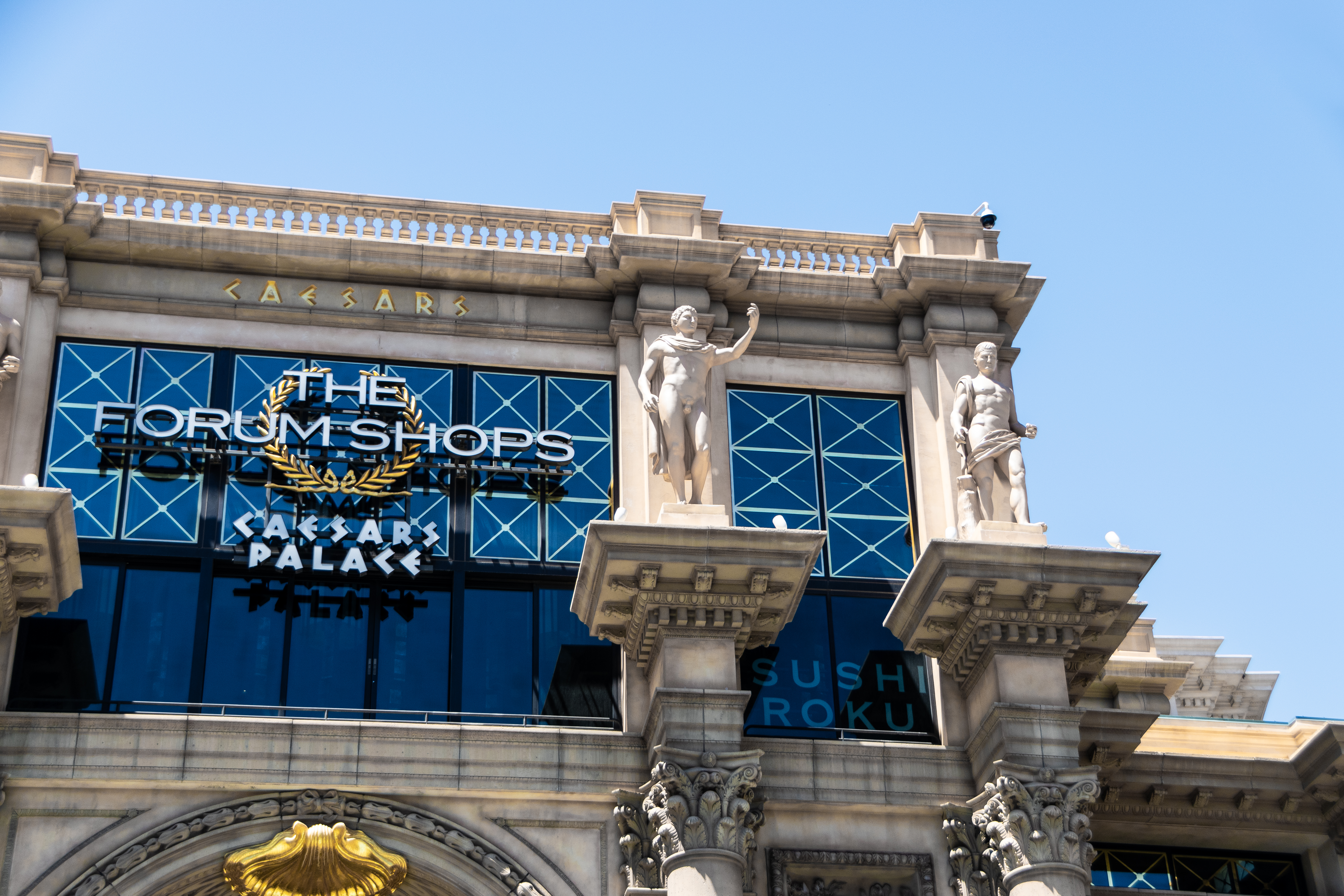
Signage and sculptures above the Trevi fountain

== See also ==
- List of shopping streets and districts by city
- The Shoppes at The Guitar Hotel
